= ITU Plenipotentiary Conference =

Treaty-making conference of the United Nations on ICT and telecommunications

Plenipotentiary Conference
- Date: 9 November 2026– 27 November 2026
- Location: Doha, Qatar
- Also known as: PP-26
- Participants: Member states of the International Telecommunication Union
- Website: https://pp.itu.int/2026/en/

The Plenipotentiary Conference (PP) is the highest policy-making meeting of the International Telecommunication Union (ITU). It is composed of all 194 ITU Member states and meets every four years.

The Conference determines the policies, direction and activities of the ITU, as well as electing the members of other ITU organizations, and positions at the secretariat, namely the Secretary-General, the Deputy Secretary-General, and the Directors of the ITU's three technical bureaus: Radiocommunication, Standardization, and Development. The Plenipotentiary Conference also elects 48 Member States to serve on the ITU Council and 12 Member States to serve on the Radio Regulations Board (RRB).

== Sessions ==
=== PP-14 ===
The 2014 Plenipotentiary Conference (PP-14) was held 20 October to 7 November 2014 in Busan (Republic of Korea).

=== PP-18 ===
The 2018 Plenipotentiary Conference (PP-18) was held from 29 October until 16 November in Dubai (United Arab Emirates). The conference elected the following ITU officers at the secretariat:

- Secretary-General: Houlin Zhao (2nd term)
- Deputy Secretary-General: Malcolm Johnson (2nd term)
- Director of the Radiocommunication Bureau: Mario Maniewicz (1st term)
- Director of the Standardization Bureau: Chaesub Lee (2nd term)
- Director of the Development Bureau: Doreen Bogdan-Martin (1st term)

The conference saw a shift in debate from traditional telecommunications infrastructure issues to emerging tensions over digital applications and services, with developing countries seeking ITU engagement with over-the-top services, artificial intelligence, and other ICT applications, while developed countries raised concerns about mission creep and the ITU entering areas beyond its core telecommunications expertise.

=== PP-22 ===
The 2022 Plenipotentiary Conference (PP-22) was held from 26 September until 8 October in Bucharest, Romania. The election of the ITU Secretary-General attracted some attention because it was between Doreen Bogdan-Martin of the United States and Rashid Ismailov of Russia. In the end, the conference elected the following ITU officers:

- Secretary-General: Doreen Bogdan-Martin (1st term)
- Deputy Secretary-General: Tomas Lamanauskas (1st term)
- Director of the Radiocommunication Bureau (ITU-R): Mario Maniewicz (2nd term)
- Director of the Standardization Bureau (ITU-T): Seizo Onoe (first term)
- Director of the Development Bureau (ITU-D): Cosmas Luckyson Zavazava (first term)

Bogdan-Martin became the first woman to lead the ITU since its founding in 1865. She won with 139 of the 172 votes cast. The conference also elected the 48 members of the ITU Council and the 12 members of the Radio Review Board. Additionally, the conference chose Doha, Qatar, as the site of the 2026 Plenipotentiary Conference.

=== PP-26 ===
The 2026 Plenipotentiary Conference (PP-26) will be held from 9 to 27 November 2026 in Doha, Qatar. The logo for PP-26 is a version of a shell holding a pearl.

== See also ==
- ITU Telecom World
