= François Rancy =

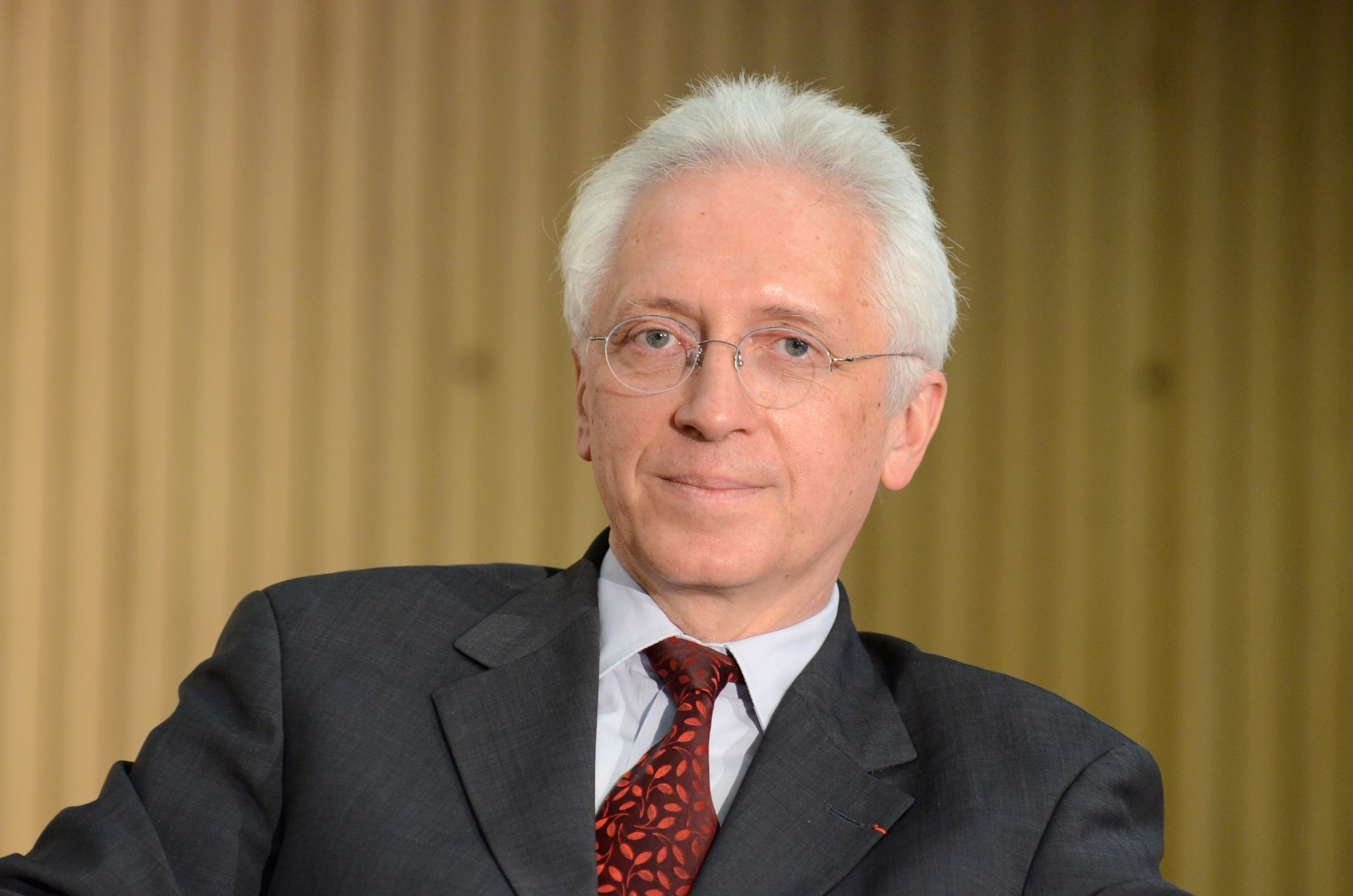

Director Radiocommunication Bureau (ITU-R)
- Incumbent
- Assumed office 1 January 2011
- Deputy: Mario Maniewicz

Personal details
- Education: École Polytechnique, École Nationale Supérieure des Télécommunications
- Website: https://www.itu.int/en/ITU-R/Director/

François Rancy is the Director of the ITU Radiocommunication Bureau, the permanent secretariat of the International Telecommunication Union Radiocommunication Sector (ITU-R). Rancy was elected at the 2010 Plenipotentiary Conference in Guadalajara, Mexico, with the term beginning on 1 January 2011. At the 2014 ITU Plenipotentiary Conference Busan, Rancy was elected to a second term.
