= Doreen Bogdan-Martin =

Secretary-General of the ITU

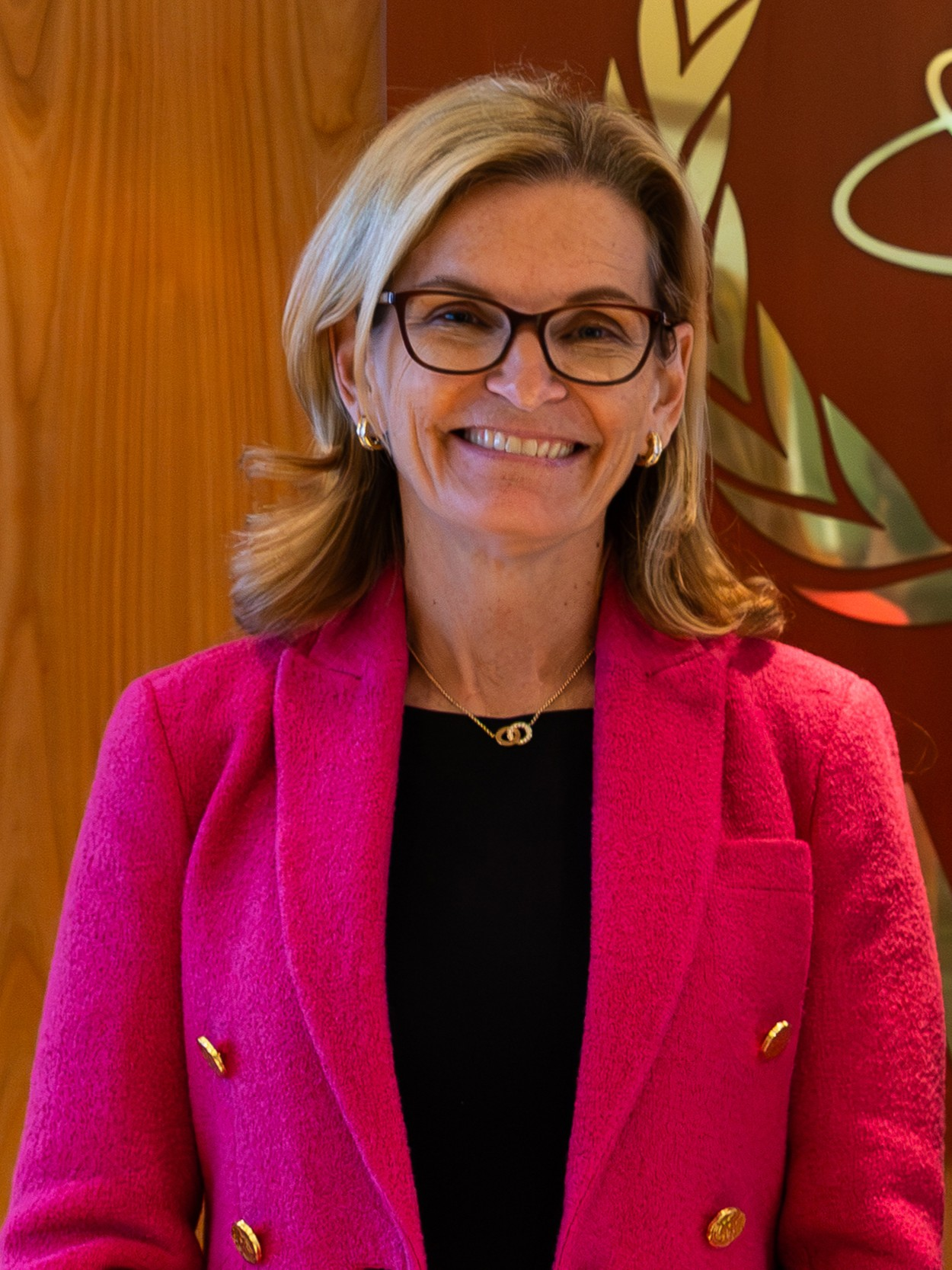
- Bogdan-Martin in 2026

Secretary General of the International Telecommunication Union
- Incumbent
- Assumed office 1 January 2023
- Deputy: Tomas Lamanauskas
- Preceded by: Houlin Zhao

Personal details
- Born: 1966 (age 59–60) Monmouth County, New Jersey, U.S.
- Education: University of Delaware (BA); American University (MA)

Doreen Bogdan-Martin (born 1966) is an international civil servant and current Secretary-General of the International Telecommunication Union. She was elected at the 2022 ITU Plenipotentiary Conference in Bucharest, and as the first woman in the 157-year history of the ITU to become the Secretary-General. Previously, she was the first woman to become an Elected Official of the ITU, as the Director of the Telecommunication Development Bureau of the ITU (the Secretariat of ITU-D).

== Education and early Career ==
Born in Monmouth County, New Jersey, Bogdan-Martin graduated from American University with a Master's degree in International Communications Policy, and with a Bachelor's degree from the University of Delaware. She holds a post-graduate certification in Strategies for Leadership from the Institute for Management Development in Lausanne, Switzerland, and is certified in Accountability and Ethics by the United Nations Leaders Programme.

Bogdan-Martin began her career as a Telecom specialist at the National Telecommunications and Information Administration, US Department of Commerce in 1989.

== International Telecommunication Union Career ==
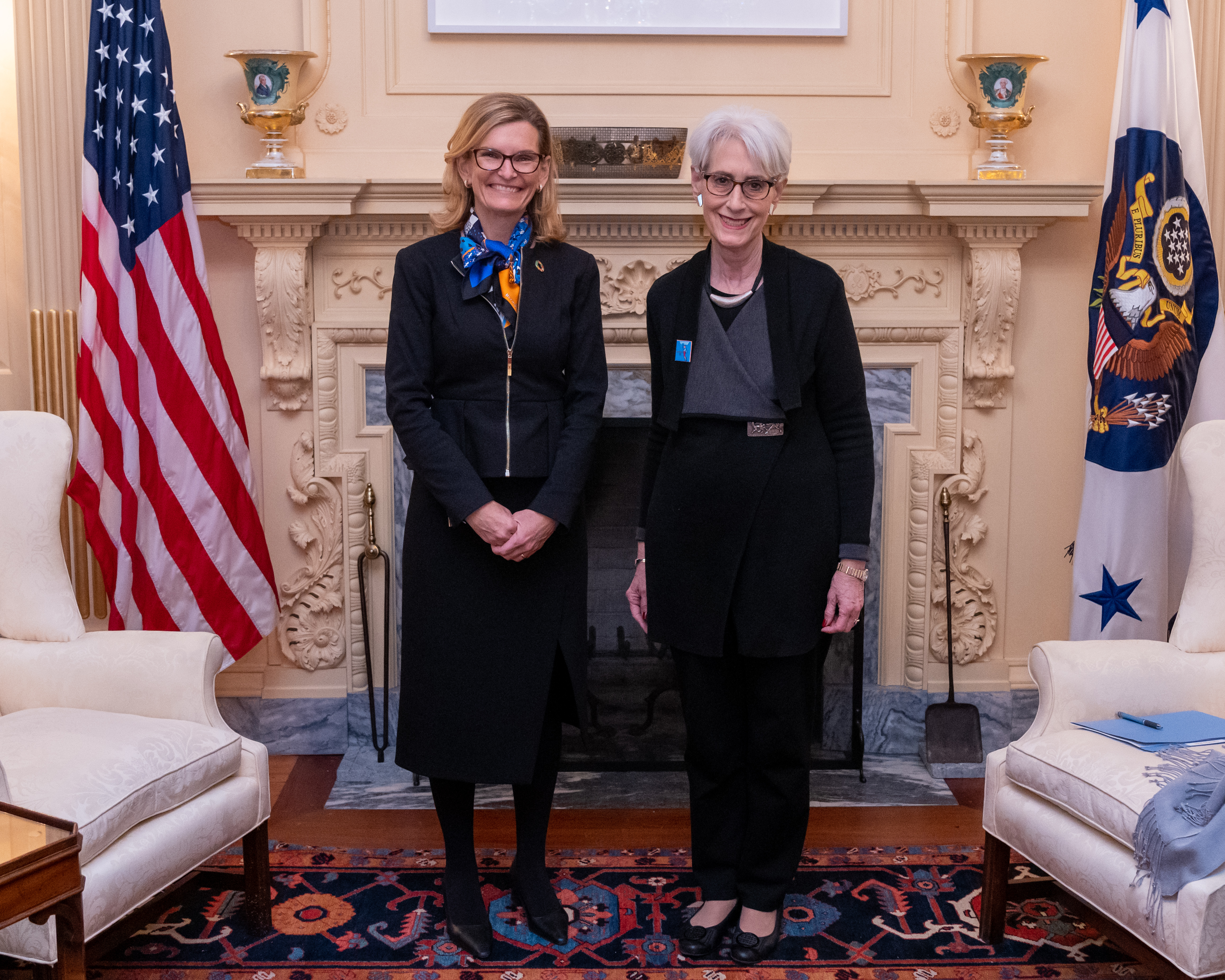
Bogdan-Martin (left) with US Deputy Secretary of State Wendy Sherman in 2022

In 1994, Bogdan-Martin joined the International Telecommunication Union's Telecommunication Development Bureau as a Policy analyst. She was instrumental in the creation of the Global Symposium for Regulators (GSR), the only global gathering for the world's ICT regulators; as well as the ICT Regulatory collection tool and portal (ICT-Eye).

In 2003, she became head of the Regulatory Reform Unit, leading the Regulatory Reform Programme and co-authoring the annual "Trends in Telecommunication Reform" report from 2003 through 2007. In 2005, she became head of the Regulatory and Market Environment Division, managing programmes on regulatory reform, economics, and finance and advising governments on ICT reform and policy issues. In January 2008, Bogdan-Martin became Chief of the Strategic Planning and Membership department, the senior most position in the ITU's General Secretariat, and the first woman to ever occupy this position. She advised the ITU Secretary General and oversaw the organisation's Membership, Corporate Communications and External Affairs. She served as Secretary to the ITU governing body, and as Coordinator of United Nations affairs for the organization, where she created the ITU liaison office to the UN in New York.

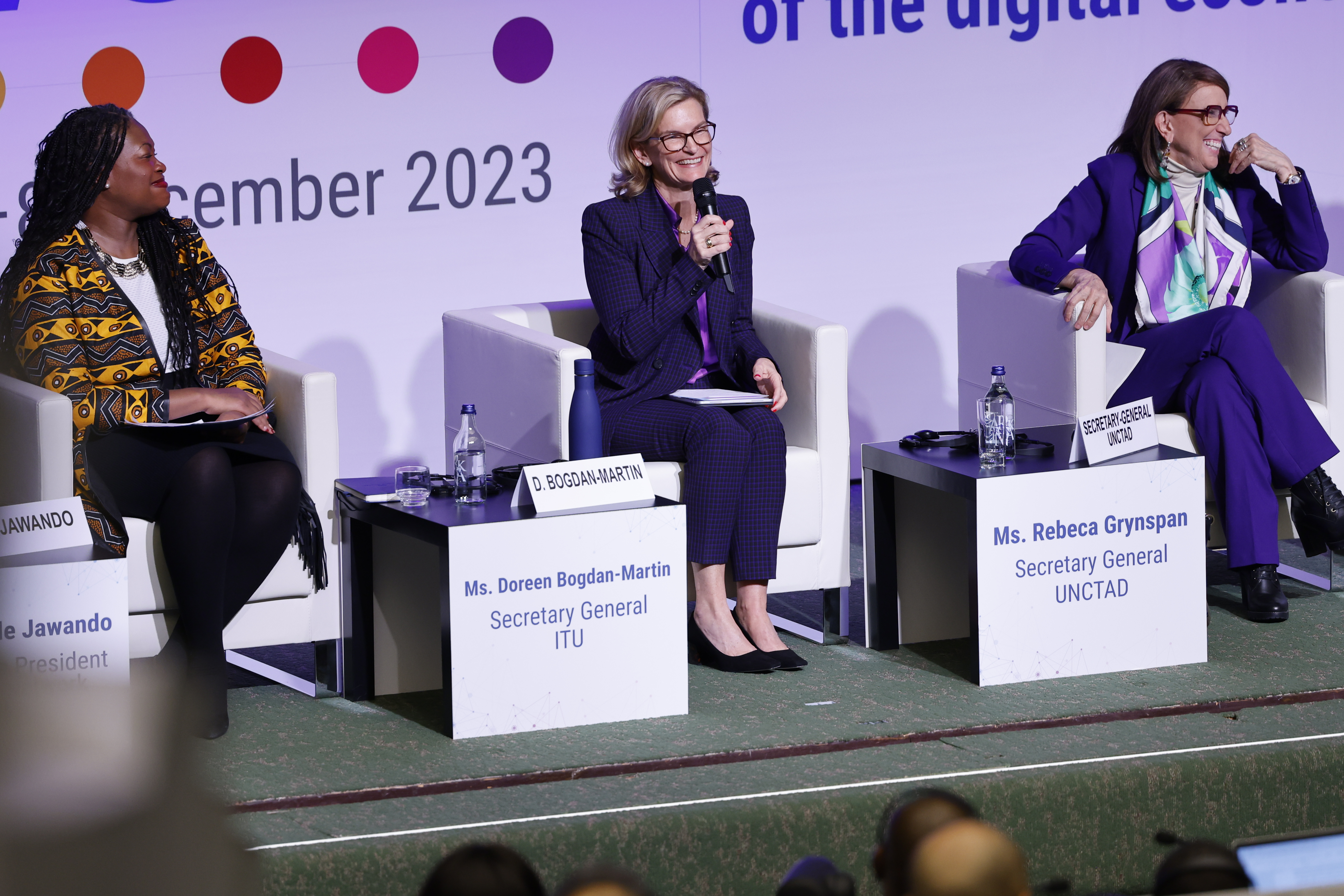
Michele Jawando, Bogdan-Martin and Rebeca Grynspan at UNCTAD eWeek in December 2023

Bogdan-Martin also served as the Executive Director of the Broadband Commission for Sustainable Development, Co-Founder of the EQUALS Global Partnership to bridge the digital divide, co-creator of the Giga school connectivity program with UNICEF, and creator of the Generation Connect initiative. As Director, she has focused on delivering new partnerships, global initiatives on connectivity, innovation, digital transformation and youth engagement.

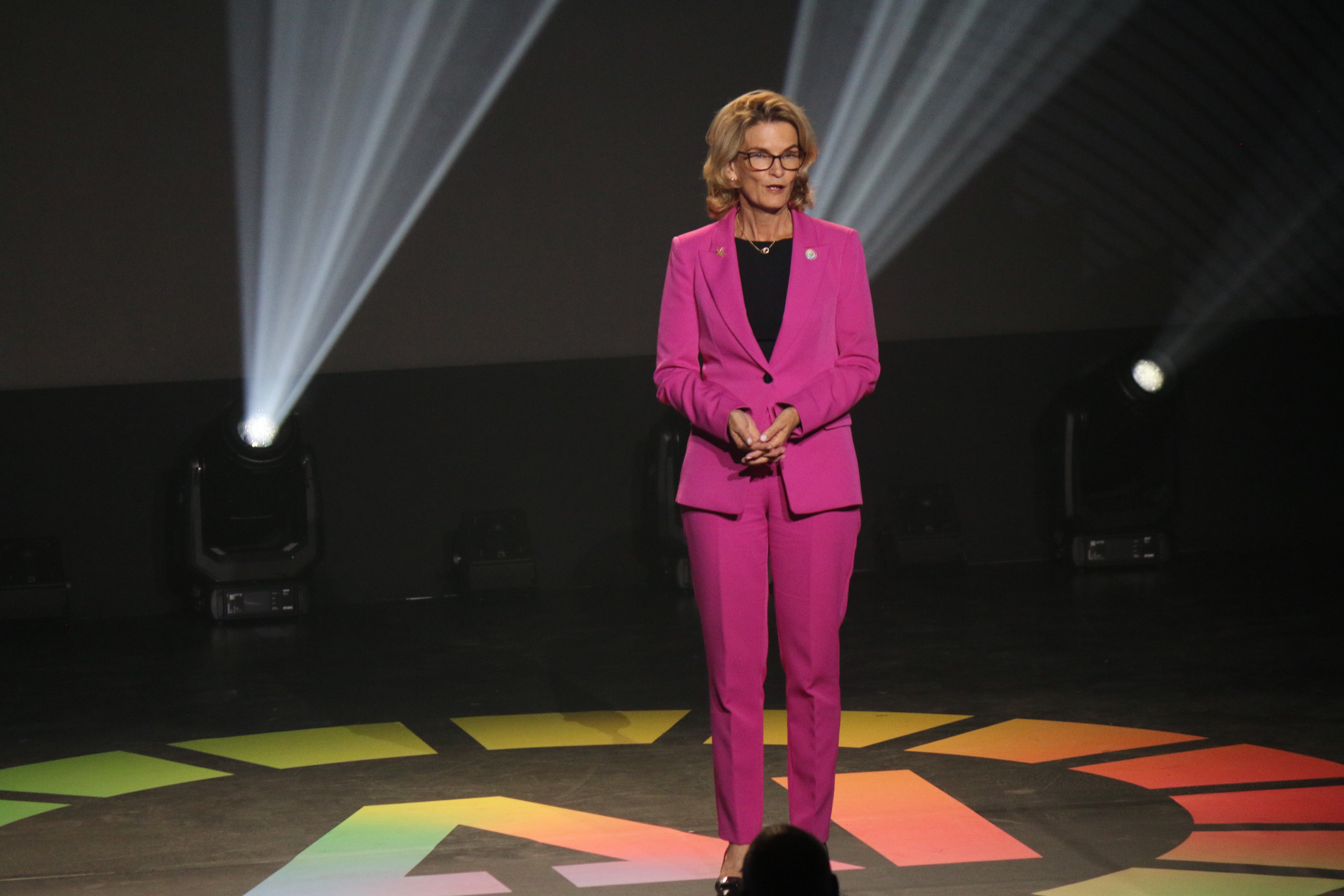
Bogdan-Martin at 2025 AI for Good in Geneva

On 29 September 2022, Bogdan-Martin was elected as the 20th Secretary-General of the ITU at the Plenipotentiary Conference in Bucharest, Romania. She received 139 votes out of 172, defeating Russia's Rashid Ismailov. She is the first woman to serve as the ITU Secretary-General.

== Professional affiliations ==
Bogdan-Martin an affiliate of the Harvard University Berkman-Klein Center for Internet and Society and a member of the World Economic Forum Global Future Council on Virtual Reality(VR) / Augmented Reality(AR).

She is a Generation Unlimited Champion and a Champion of the EDISON Alliance led by the World Economic Forum. Other advisory bodies she serves on includes the Geneva-Tsinghua Initiative, the SDG Lab Advisory Board, the UN Technology Innovation Labs, and the Alumni Expert Council of the Internet Governance Lab of American University in Washington D.C. Bogdan-Martin is a member of the Amateur Radio League, and the IEEE.

She previously served as member of the Board of Governors of the UN Staff College, Chair of the United Nations Strategic Planning Group, and Member of the Governing Committee of the Swiss Network for International Studies.

== Personal life ==
Bogdan-Martin is married and has two daughters and two sons. She is fluent in English, French and Spanish. She is an active Amateur Radio operator holding callsign KD2JTX and, in 2014, arranged for school students in Switzerland to talk live with astronauts in orbit through Amateur Radio on the International Space Station.

== Awards ==
On 23 September 2021 Bogdan-Martin was awarded the American University's Outstanding Technology Policy Changemaker Award for technology policy and creating a more just, equitable, and productive society. On 27 February, GSMA awarded Bogdan-Martin the 2023 Chairman's Award for "outstanding achievements of individuals or organisations from across the mobile industry" - specifically for creating the Partner2Connect initiative (a global leadership platform to facilitate partnerships aimed at expanding digital inclusion).

On 28 March 2023 it was announced that Bogdan-Martin was awarded the IEEE President's Award for "distinguished leadership and contributions to the public".

On 11 March 2025 the Satellite Industry Association (SIA) awarded Bogdan-Martin the 2025 SIA Leadership in Government Award for her "distinguished career in both domestic and international space policy."

Forbes named Bogdan-Martin to its 2025 50 Over 50 Impact list recognizing women using their experience to benefit the world.

Diplomatic posts
Preceded by Houlin Zhao	Secretary General of the International Telecommunication Union; 2023–present	Incumbent
