= Tomas Lamanauskas =

Deputy Secretary-General of the ITU

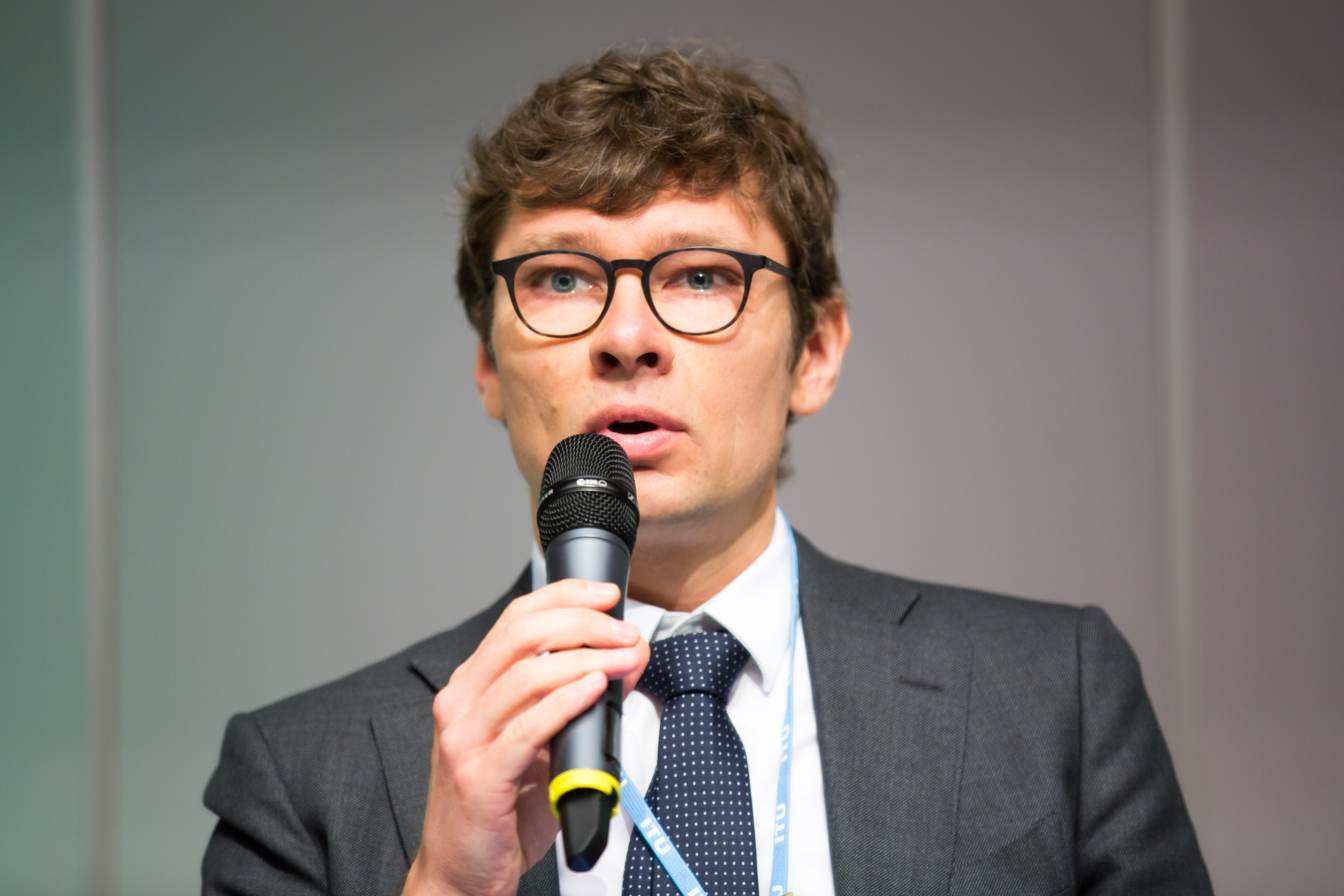

ITU Deputy Secretary-General
- Incumbent
- Assumed office 1 January 2023
- Preceded by: Malcolm Johnson

Personal details
- Born: December 25, 1979 (age 45) Lithuania
- Secretary General: Doreen Bogdan-Martin

Tomas Lamanauskas (Lithuania) is the Deputy Secretary-General of the International Telecommunication Union. Lamanauskas was elected for the term 2023–2026 at the ITU Plenipotentiary Conference 2022 (PP-22).

== Education ==
Lamanauskas obtained a Master of Public Administration from the Harvard Kennedy School, a Masters in Law from Vilnius University, and a Master in Telecommunications Regulation and Policy (University of West Indies).

== Career ==
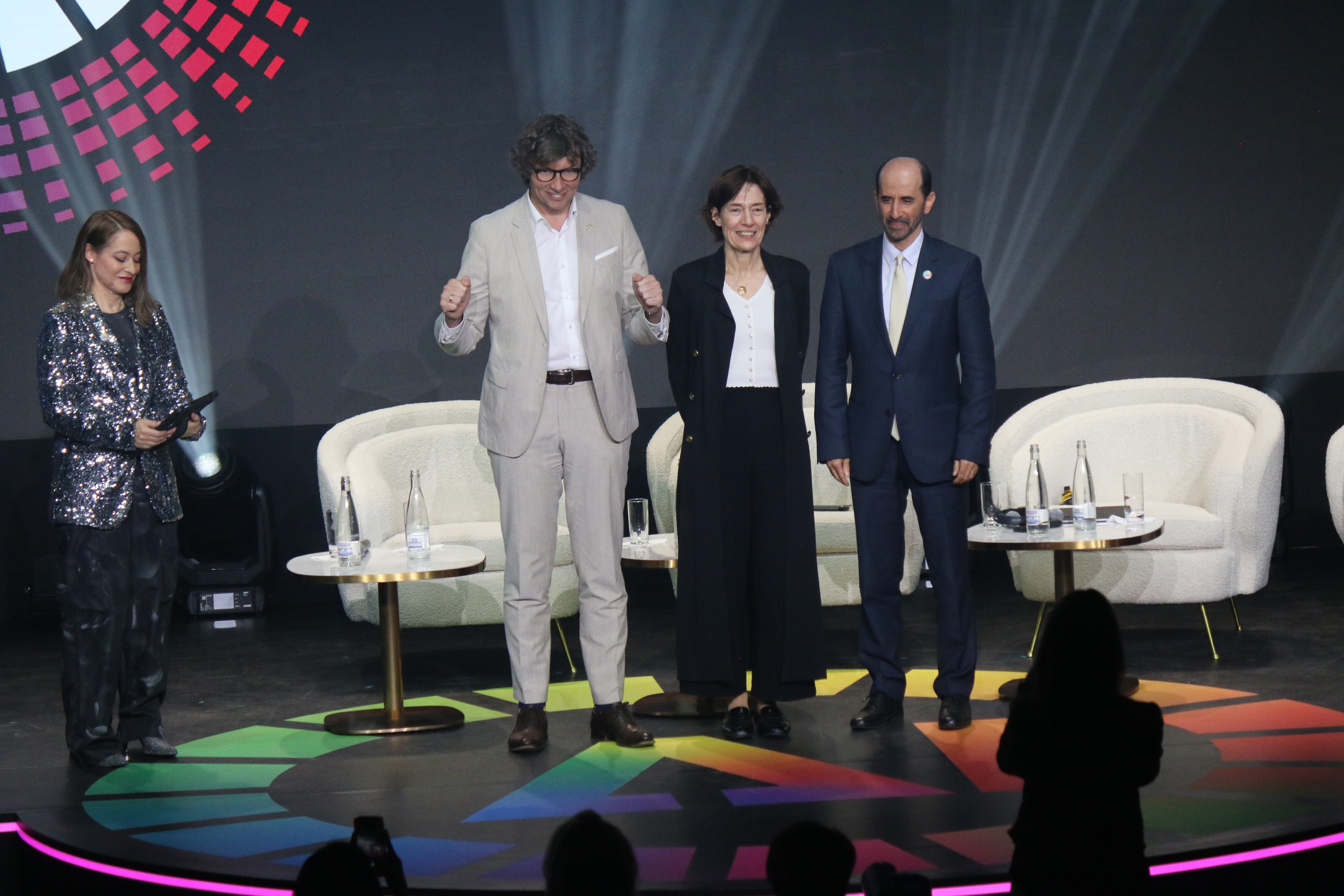
Lamanauskas, Anne Bouverot, Majed Sultan Al Mesmar at the 2025 AI for Good Summit

Prior to being elected to the office of Deputy Secretary-General of the ITU, Lamanauskas was the Director of the Public Policy Group at VEON (previously VimpelCom).

=== ITU ===
Lamanauskas previously served as the head of the Corporate Strategy Division of the ITU.
