= Broadband Commission for Sustainable Development =

Initiative to promote internet access

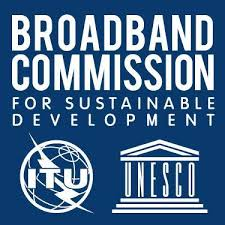
- Logo
- Secretariat: ITU, Geneva (International territory)

Government
  - Co-Chair: H.E. Paul Kagame
  - Co-Chair: Carlos Slim
  - Co-Vice Chair: Houlin Zhao
  - Co-Vice Chair: Audrey Azoulay
  - Executive Secretary: Doreen Bogdan-Martin

Establishment
  - established: 1 May 2010 (16 years ago)
- Website www.broadbandcommission.org

The Broadband Commission for Sustainable Development (until 2015: Digital Development) was established in May 2010 as a joint initiative by the International Telecommunication Union (ITU) and the United Nations Educational, Scientific and Cultural Organization (UNESCO) to promote Internet access, in particular, broadband networks in order to help achieve ... United Nations' development goals, such as the Millennium Development Goals. The Commission was renamed the Broadband Commission for Sustainable Development, following the adoption of the UN's Sustainable Development Goals in September 2015.

== Structure ==
The commission is jointly chaired by Rwandan president Paul Kagame and America Movil owner Carlos Slim, and jointly vice-chaired by the heads to the two founding UN agencies, the Secretary-General of the International Telecommunication Union Doreen Bogdan-Martin, and UNESCO's Director-General Audrey Azoulay.

"Members of the commission include, policy-makers and government representatives, international agencies, academia and organizations concerned with development. In addition to its chairs and vice-chairs, 53 commissioners included Jeff Sachs, Hans Vestberg, Phumzile Mlambo-Ngcuka, and Henrietta Fore. Leaders in their field, the Commissioners believe strongly in a future based on broadband and offer rich insights and experience in how to deploy and use broadband networks and services to the benefit of communities and end-users. The Commission embraces a range of different perspectives in a multi-stakeholder approach to promoting the roll-out of broadband, as well as providing a fresh approach to engaging with ... UN and businesses".

== Advocacy ==
The Broadband Commission engages in high-level advocacy to promote broadband in developing countries and underserved communities. One of the Commission's stated goals is to advocate that broadband infrastructures be given the highest priority level in future development policy and city planning frameworks.

To date, the Commission's output has included several major reports, including A 2010 Leadership Imperative: The Future Built on Broadband, presented to the then United Nations' Secretary-General Ban Ki-moon in September 2010, before the 2010 United Nations MDGs Summit in New York. The document constitutes a concise, high-level report that directly reflects inputs from the Commission's community of high-level business executives and policy-makers and contains a number of policy recommendations and "Declaration of Broadband Inclusion for All".

In September 2015, the Broadband Commission released a report on cyber violence against women, which addressed online harassment targeted at women.

=== 2011-2015 targets ===
As part of its advocacy work, in 2011 the commission established a framework of four "ambitious but achievable" targets that countries should strive to meet by 2015 in order to help achieve the MDGs through digital development.

1. by 2015, all countries should have a National Broadband Plan or strategy or include broadband in their Universal Access and Service Definition
2. by 2015, entry-level broadband services should be made affordable in developing countries
3. by 2015, 40% of households in developing countries should have Internet access
4. by 2015, Internet user penetration should reach 60% worldwide, 50% in developing countries and 15% in Least Developed Countries
5. Achieving gender equality in access to broadband by 2020

The fifth target was added in 2013, designed to spur female access to the power of information and communication technologies (ICTs).

=== 2018-2025 targets ===
In 2018, the commission launched a framework of now seven "ambitious but achievable" targets, that countries should strive to meet by the year 2025.

1. By 2025, all countries should have a funded national broadband plan or strategy, or include broadband in their universal access and services definition.
2. By 2025, entry-level broadband services should be made affordable in developing countries, at less than 2% of monthly gross national income per capita.
3. By 2025 broadband-Internet user penetration should reach:
  1. 75% worldwide
  2. 65% in developing countries
  3. 35% in least developed countries
4. By 2025, 60% of youth and adults should have achieved at least a minimum level of proficiency in sustainable digital skills.
5. By 2025, 40% of the world's population should be using digital financial services.
6. By 2025, un-connectedness of Micro-, Small- and Medium-sized Enterprises should be reduced by 50%, by sector.
7. By 2025, gender equality should be achieved across all targets.

The Broadband Commission targets were developed at ITU, and launched at the World Economic Forum 2018 in Davos.

== Universal Connectivity Manifesto ==
A Commission Manifesto issued in conjunction with the 10th Anniversary State of Broadband Report was published in 2020. It calls on the global community to recognize digital connectivity as the foundational element of the United Nations 2030 Agenda for Sustainable Development.

The Manifesto affirms the commitment of the Broadband Commission to mobilize efforts to achieve the 'Global Goal of Universal Connectivity' in support of the UN Secretary-General's Roadmap for Digital Cooperation and other connectivity initiatives.

Finally, it calls on all stakeholders to collaborate to:

- Establish a baseline for universal digital connectivity.
- Identify and support public-private financing of universal broadband, pioneering innovative hybrid and/or complementary, replicable and sustainable financing and investment models for all types of networks, and catalysing impactful partnerships.
- Advocate for enabling regulatory environments in the field of ICTs, ICT capacity-building, and online safety and security, especially for children, as integral to efforts to achieve the Global Broadband Targets 2025 and the SDGs.

== Evaluation ==
Since 2012 the Commission has published an annual State of Broadband report, positioned as a snapshot of the global broadband industry. The reports are issued every year during a high-level meeting on the side of the United Nations General Assembly in New York, and are specifically targeted at government policy-makers, as well as those engaged with setting the UN's Post 2015 development agenda. Each report includes a country ranking based on key indicators for Internet-user penetration and Internet access affordability.

In addition to its annual reports, the Broadband Commission employs working groups to address specific action items or focus areas. Working groups examine such issues as Science, Health, Climate Change, Youth, Education, Gender and Finance and Investment; and reflect the wide-ranging impact of broadband technologies across multiple sectors. Past outputs from working groups include reports, consultations and workshops.

During the countdown to 2015 and the due date for the MDGs, the Commission's advocacy and policy outreaches had increasingly been directed towards actors responsible for setting the Post-2015 Development Agenda, to recognize the importance of ICT/broadband infrastructure, networks, applications and services for sustainable economic, social and environmental development. In April 2013 the group issued an Open Letter to ... United Nations' Secretary General Ban Ki-moon's Panel of Eminent Persons, as well as a broadband manifesto in September at the 69th session of the General Assembly.

== COVID-19 response ==
The Broadband Commission for Sustainable Development has adopted an "Agenda for Action" outlining immediate measures that governments, industry, the international community and civil society can take to shore-up digital networks, strengthen capacity at critical connectivity points like hospitals and transport hubs, and boost digital access and inclusivity, with the aim of strengthening collective responses to the COVID-19 pandemic sweeping the world from 2020.

Built around three pillars: (1) Resilient Connectivity, (2) Affordable Access, and (3) Safe Use for Informed and Educated Societies, the agenda serves as a framework for the Commission's 50+ Commissioners and their organizations to share their own initiatives, make new commitments, and foster collaboration and partnerships.

== Donors ==
Donors include Grupo Carso, Digicel Group, Bharti Enterprises, Ericsson, and Cisco.
