= Malcolm Johnson =

Malcolm Johnson may refer to:

- Malcolm Johnson (administrator) (born 1947), British director of the ITU Telecommunication Standardization Bureau
- Malcolm Johnson (journalist) (1904–1976), American journalist
- Malcolm Johnson (fullback) (born 1992), American football full back and former tight end
- Malcolm Johnson (wide receiver) (born 1977), American football wide receiver
