= Malcolm Johnson (administrator) =

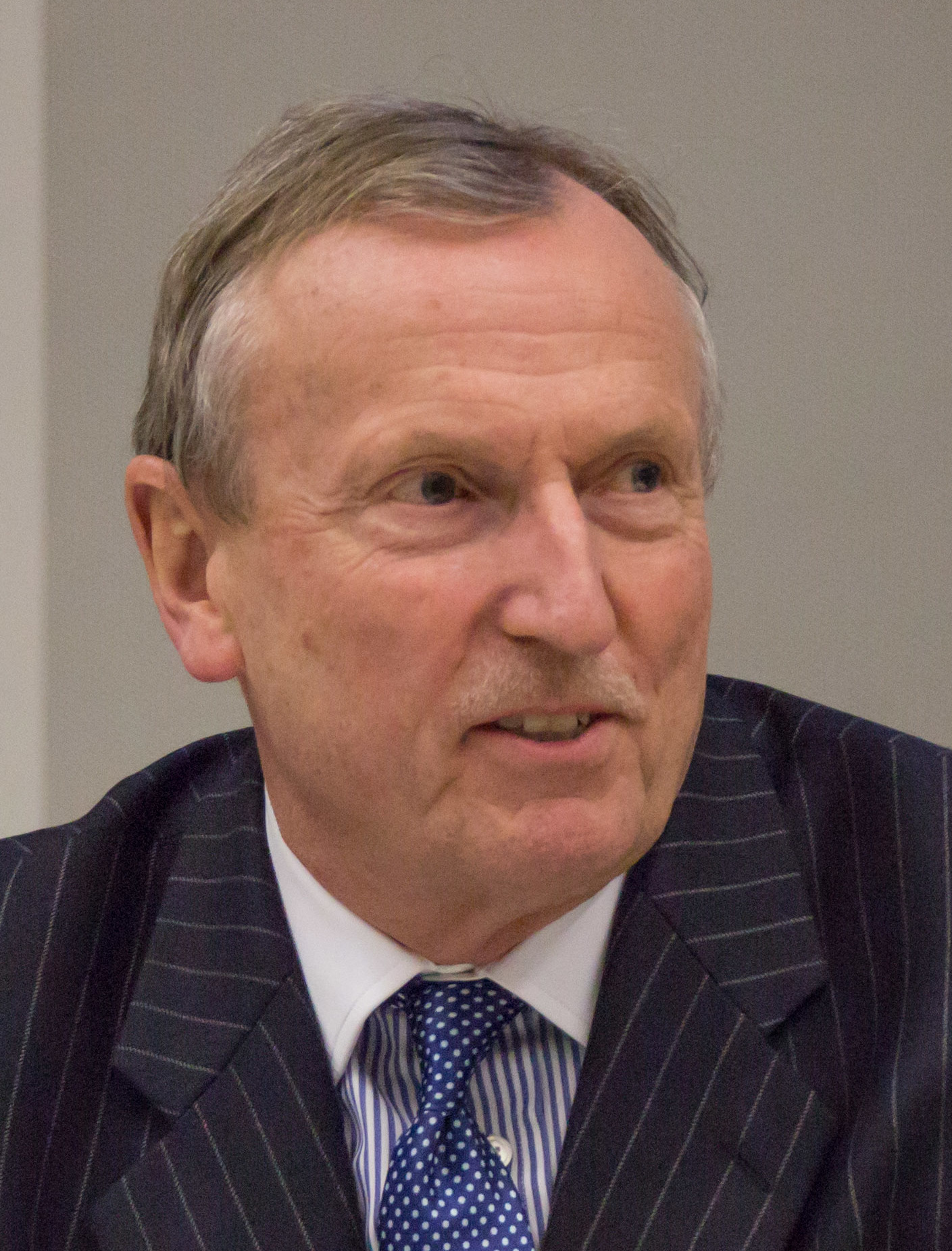
- Johnson in 2018

Deputy Secretary-General of the ITU
- In office 1 January 2015 – 31 December 2022
- Preceded by: Houlin Zhao
- Succeeded by: Tomas Lamanauskas

Personal details
- Born: 19 June 1947 (age 78) Trallwng, Wales, United Kingdom

Malcolm Johnson CMG (born 19 June 1947) is a British civil servant. He is the Deputy Secretary-General of the ITU and former Director of the Telecommunication Standardization Bureau (TSB) of the ITU Standardization Sector (ITU-T). He was elected Director by the ITU Plenipotentiary Conference, 2006 in Antalya, Turkey. He took office on 1 January 2007 and was re-elected at the ITU Plenipotentiary Conference 2010. At the ITU Plenipotentiary Conference 2014 in Busan, he was elected to a term as Deputy Secretary-General, and at the 2018 ITU Plenipotentiary Conference in Dubai, he was reelected to a second term.

== Early years and education ==
Born in Trallwng, a small town in the principal area Powys of Wales. Attended Cardiff University (Bachelor of Science Degree with 1st Class Honours; Master of Science Degree; Chartered Engineer; Fellow of Institution of Engineering and Technology).

== Career and work experience ==
Johnson represented UK in several international organizations, including the International Maritime Organization (IMO), Inmarsat, and the European Space Agency (ESA). He was employed at the Telecommunication Regulations Division of the European Commission between 1987 and 1992. Later on, from 1992 to 2003, Johnson was Director of the UK's Radiocommunications Agency. In 2003, Johnson joined the UK Office of Communications (Ofcom) at its inception, he was International Coordinator with lead responsibility for UK in ITU and European Conference of Postal and Telecommunications Administrations (CEPT). He remained in this position until 2006.

=== ITU ===
Johnson has been Head or Deputy Head of UK Delegations to all ITU conferences, assemblies and advisory groups since 1991.

During his first term Johnson has spearheaded increased ITU-T activity in areas including: cybersecurity; climate change; and accessibility to ICTs for persons with disabilities. His tenure has also seen a push for increased involvement of developing countries and academia in ITU's standards activities and a programme to address developing country concerns over lack of interoperability and conformity to ITU standards.

Johnson was appointed Companion of the Order of St Michael and St George (CMG) in the 2023 New Year Honours for services to the United Nations, the Commonwealth and global information and communication technologies.

==== Major achievements ====
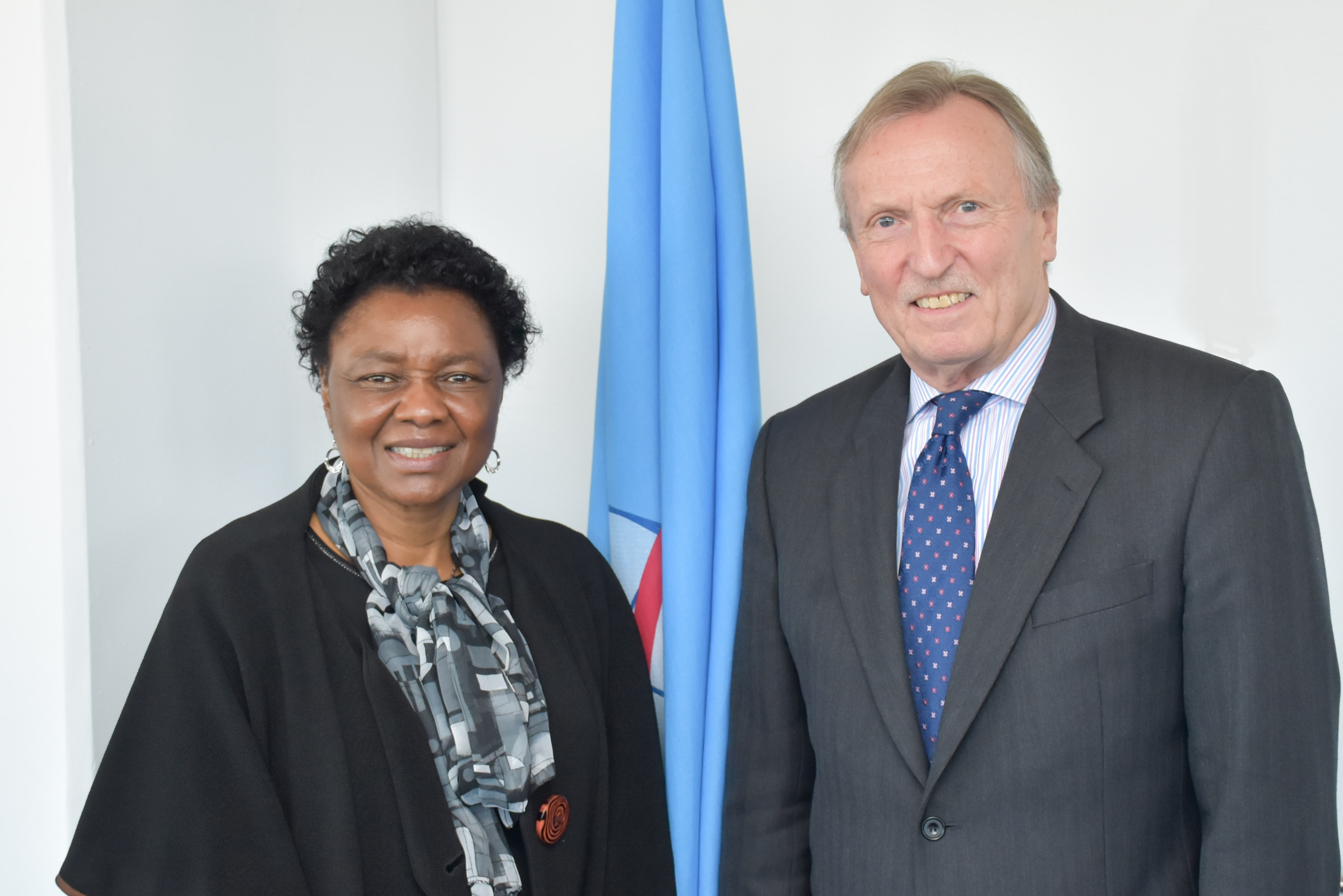
Her Excellency Professor Hlengiwe Mkhize, Deputy Minister of Communications of South Africa with Johnson in 2016

Johnson was responsible for many initiatives in the management, structure and functioning of ITU. Among these achievements are his proposal for the new Global Standards Collaboration (Sydney, 2001), chairing the Reform Group on standardization prior to Plenipotentiary Conference 2002 and initiation of many reforms in ITU-T to speed up the work and increase the role of the private sector.

He also initiated the process for regional preparations for ITU conferences, established and chaired the first interregional group to prepare for an ITU conference (1995) and established the Commonwealth ITU group. In addition he further enhanced the CEPT preparatory process for ITU conferences which he promoted in other regions. This CEPT process, which includes European Common Proposals and co-ordination procedures was initiated by Jean-Louis Blanc (F) David Court (G) and Klaus Olms (D) at the Cardiff (1985) and subsequent meetings of CEPT's Radiocommunications Group, in preparation for ITU Conferences held in 1985, 1987 and 1988.

=== Other experience ===
In addition to his ITU experience, Johnson has four years’ experience working in the European Commission where he was responsible for the projects and legislation supporting the development of the GSM and DECT technical standards. He also represented the European Commission in CEPT and the European Telecommunications Standards Institute (ETSI).
