= Louis Curchod =

Swiss engineer

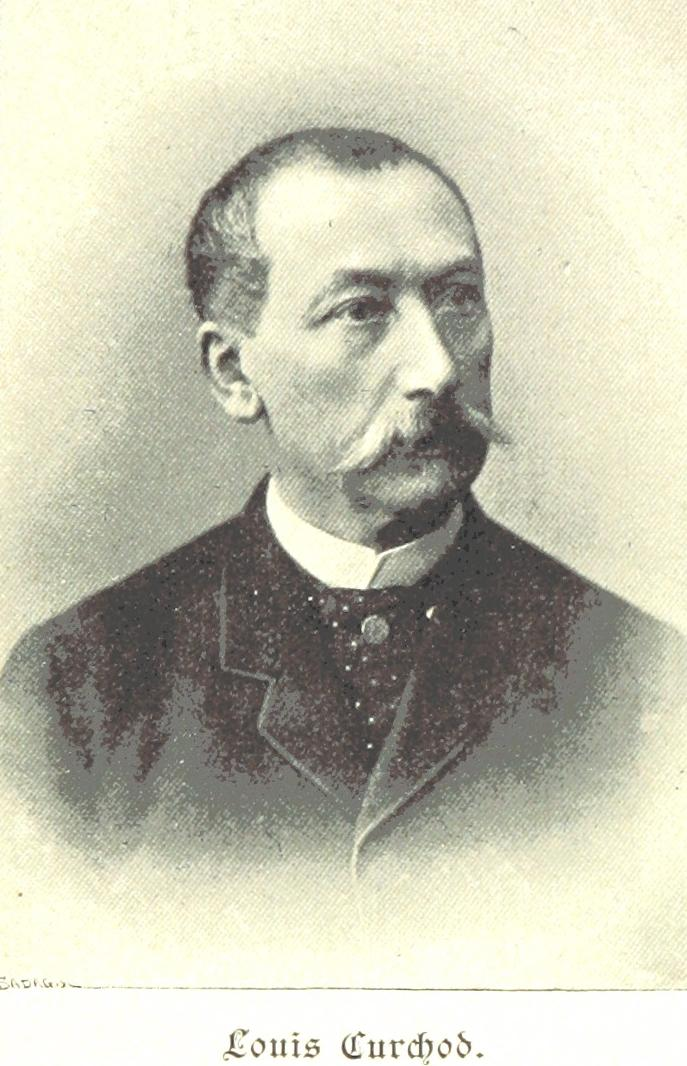

Director International Bureau
- In office 1 April 1873 – 18 October 1889
- Preceded by: Charles Lendi
- Succeeded by: August Frey
- In office 1 January 1869 – 31 December 1869
- Preceded by: Office created
- Succeeded by: Charles Lendi

Personal details
- Born: 7 October 1826 Crissier, Switzerland
- Died: 18 October 1889 (aged 63)
- Education: École Centrale Paris

Louis Curchod (7 October 1826 – 18 October 1889) Swiss engineer, telegraph specialist, Director of the Swiss Telegraph Service, and first head of the International Telegraph Bureau (today known as the ITU).

== Early life ==
Curchod was born in 1826, to a pastor in Crissier, in the Vaud canton of Switzerland. He studied engineering at the École Centrale des Arts et Manufactures in Paris, from which he graduated in 1849. For a short period he worked in railway construction; then, in 1852, he became the service inspector of Lausanne's telegraphic system. In 1857 the Swiss government (Federal Council) elevated him to become Director of Switzerland's Federal Administration of Telegraphs.

== International Telegraph Union ==
Curchod represented Switzerland at the first International Telegraph Conference, held in Paris in 1865, which saw the birth of ITU. The second International Telegraph Conference in 1868 created a permanent central secretariat for the Union in Bern. Originally called the Bureau international des Administrations télégraphiques, the secretariat was supervised by the Swiss government and which also appointed its director. Louis Curchod was the first person in that post, which he held for some twenty years until his death in 1889 with a brief interruption of 1870-1873 during the tenure of Charles Lendi, while Curchod served as director of French transatlantic cable project.

The ITU secretariat in Bern started with just three members of staff, who had to turn their hands to every task. For instance, the precursor of today's ITU News (the Journal Télégraphique) was initially produced in Curchod's own home with the help of his household. He oversaw the International Telegraph Conferences of 1871 in Rome, 1875 in St Petersburg, 1879 in London and 1885 in Berlin.

Curchod received many honours from member governments of ITU, including admittance to the French Légion d'honneur.

Preceded by Office created	Director International Bureau; 1869–1869	Succeeded by Charles Lendi
Preceded by Charles Lendi	Director International Bureau; 1873–1889	Succeeded by August Frey
