= Seizo Onoe =

Director of ITU Standardization Bureau

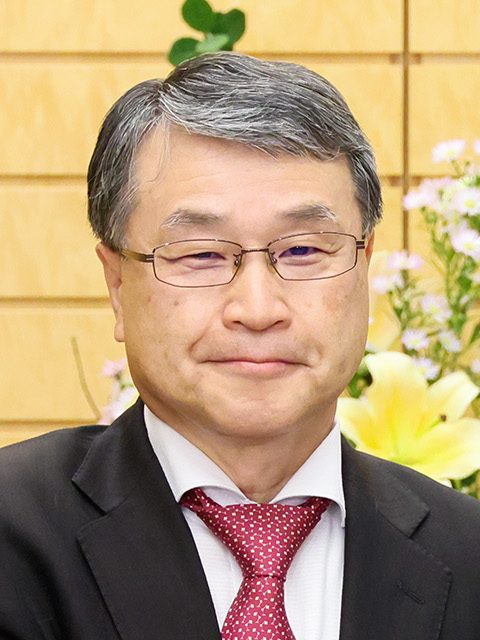

Director Standardization (TSB, ITU)
- Incumbent
- Assumed office 1 January 2023

Personal details
- Born: 12 May 1957 (age 68) Akashi, Hyogo, Japan

Seizo Onoe, a Japanese telecommunication executive, is the Director of the Telecommunication Standardization Bureau of the International Telecommunication Union, the Secretariat of ITU-T. Onoe was elected to the post of Director of the TSB for the term 2023-2026 at the ITU Plenipotentiary Conference 2022 (PP-22).

== Career ==
Prior to being elected, Onoe had a career with Japanese mobile operator NTT DOCOMO for over thirty years. As of 2021, he served as Executive Vice President and Chief Standardization Strategy Officer for the Nippon Telegraph and Telephone (NTT) Corporation as well as simultaneously a Fellow of NTT DOCOMO.

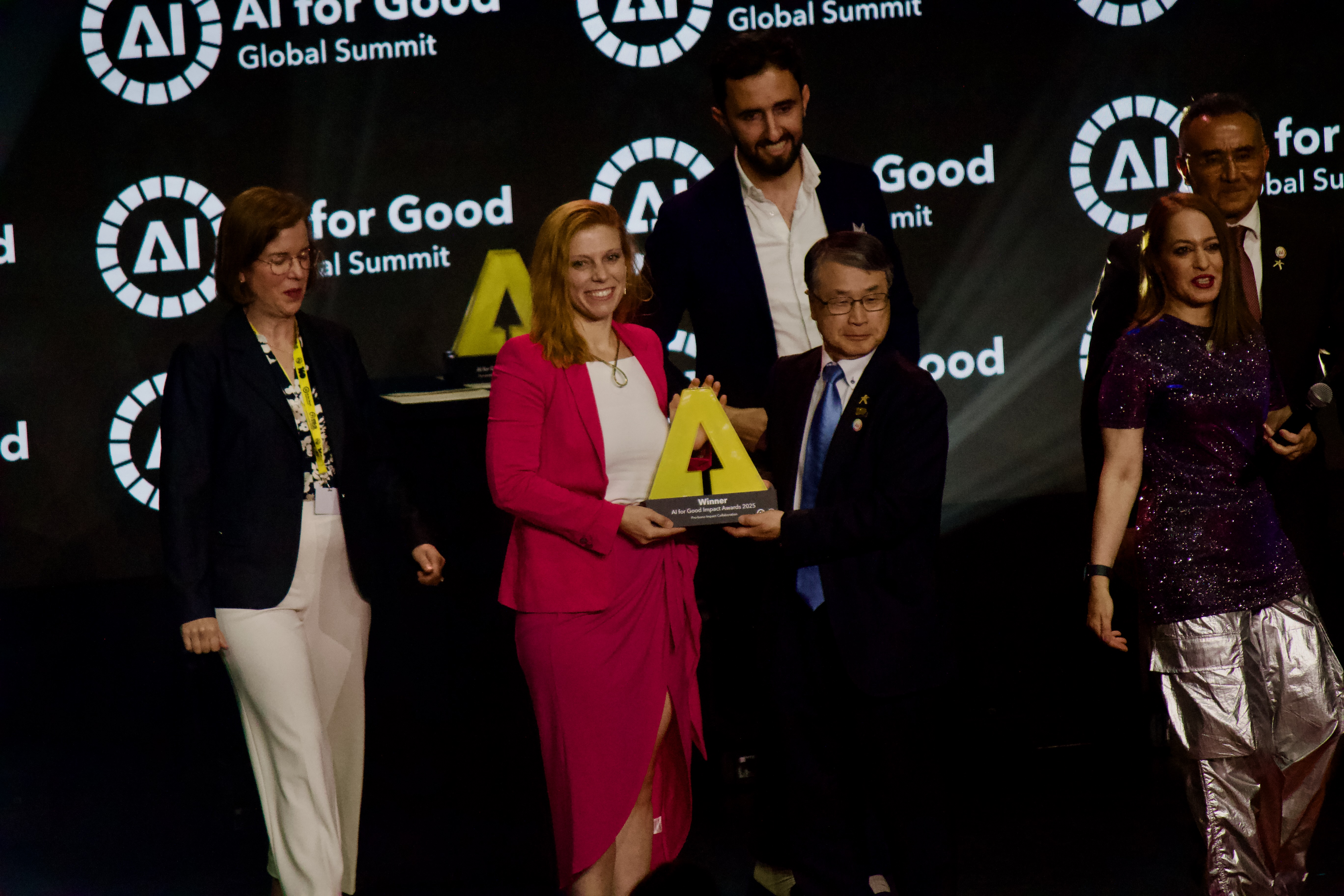
Seizo Onoe presents award at AI for Good in Geneva (2025)

Between 2017 and 2021, he served as NTT DOCOMO’s Chief Technology Architect as well as President of the DOCOMO Technology subsidiary.

From 2012 until 2017, Onoe held the position of Chief Technology Officer and Executive Vice President, (Member of the Board of Directors and Managing Director of R&D Innovation Division) at NTT DOCOMO. Prior to this, he served as Senior Vice President and Managing Director of NTT DOCOMO’s R&D Strategy Department and Managing Director of the company’s Radio Network Development Department.

== Studies ==
Seizo Onoe holds Master’s and Bachelor's degrees in Electrical Engineering from the Kyoto University (Graduate School of Engineering).

== Personal life ==
Mr. Onoe is married and has two children.
