= Giga (United Nations) =

United Nations Inter-Agency work programme

- Abbreviation: Giga
- Legal status: Active
- Headquarters: Geneva
- Parent organization: ITU, UNICEF
- Website: giga.global

Giga is a joint programme of work of two United Nations agencies, the United Nations International Children's Emergency Fund (UNICEF) and the International Telecommunication Union (ITU), with the goal of connecting all of the world's schools to the internet. The programme was launched in 2019 and has three categories of activity: mapping, to identify the schools in an area, financing, to provide financial resources to the schools, and connecting, to help establish connectivity.

In February 2022, the Secretary-General of the United Nations called on the United Nations General Assembly to recognize "access to the internet as a basic human right, and for steps to achieve this for everyone everywhere by 2030, including through the Giga initiative ...".

== Active countries ==
As of February 2022, the following status information was reported by the Giga initiative:

- Central Asia
  - Kazakhstan: 7,410 schools mapped, RfPs issued for feasibility study and connecting about 60 schools
  - Kyrgyzstan: 692 schools connected
- Latin America and Eastern Caribbean
  - Eastern Caribbean States (OECS): 9 of 11 countries completed mapping of school connectivity, 457 schools connected
  - Honduras: 545 schools connected, about 1,097 schools mapped via satellite imagery that were not in government registries
- Sub-Saharan Africa
  - Rwanda: about 1,530 schools mapped via satellite imagery that were not in government registries
  - Kenya: 75 schools connected
  - Sierra Leone: 205 schools connected
  - Niger: RfP for feasibility study published

By December 2023, more than 2.1 million schools had been mapped in more than 138 countries.

== Headquarters ==
According to a July 2022 article in La Vanguardia, the project offices were to be located in a refurbished warehouse in Barcelona which houses an innovation centre known as Ca l'Alier.
