= Ingmar Weber =

German computer scientist (born 1978)

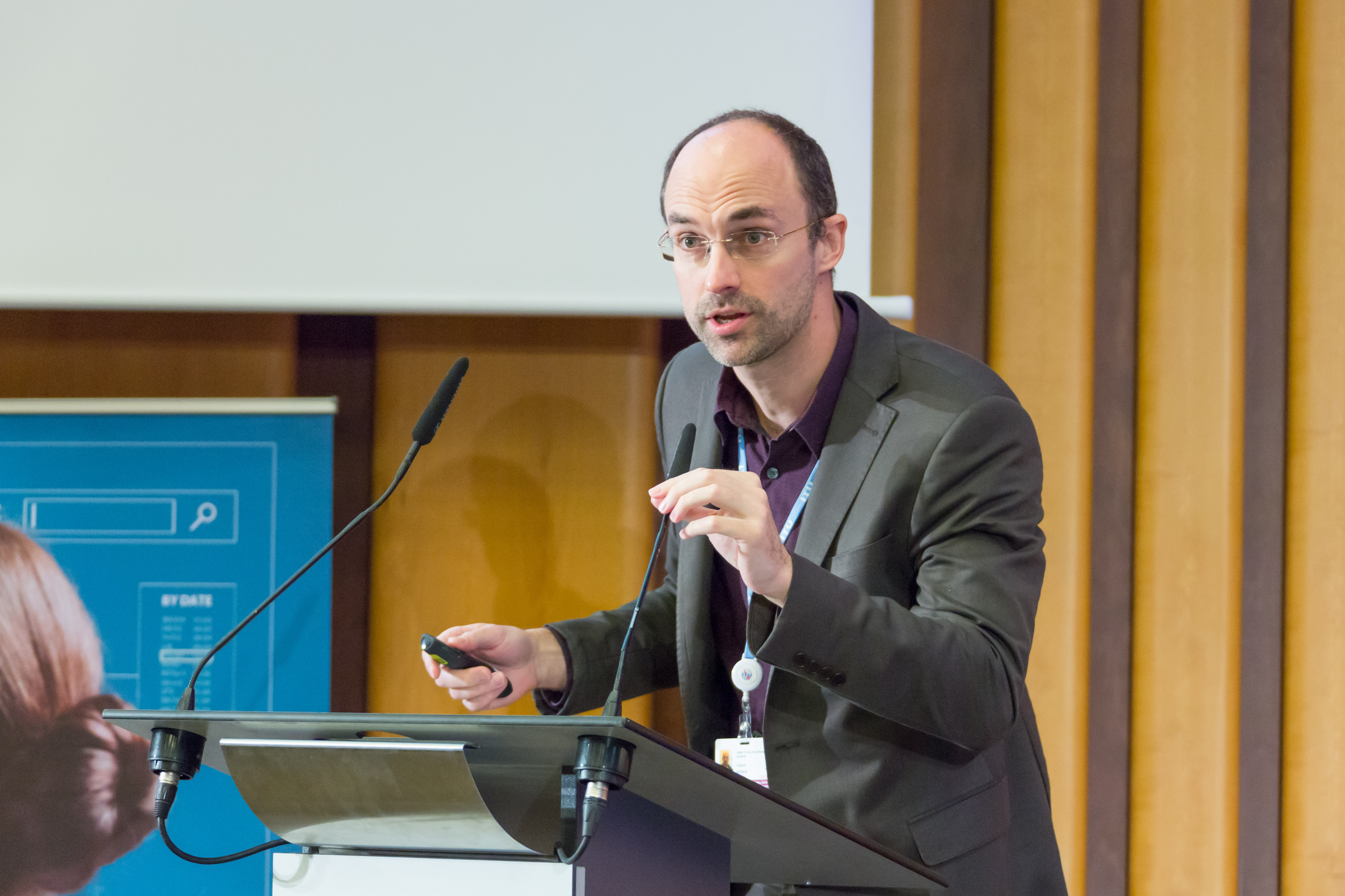
- Weber speaking at the ITU AI for Good Global Summit 2018
- Born: 14 September 1978 (age 48); Minden, Germany

Academic background
- Education: University of Cambridge, Saarland University
- Thesis: Efficient index structures for and applications of the CompleteSearch engine (2007)
- Doctoral advisor: Hannah Bast

Academic work
- Main interests: Computational social science
- Website: https://ingmarweber.de/

Ingmar Weber is a German computer scientist known for his research on Computational Social Science in which he uses online data to study population behavior. He was the Research Director for Social Computing at the Qatar Computing Research Institute, and is a Professor at Saarland University. He serves as editor-in-chief for EPJ Data Science. Previously, he served as editor-in-chief for the International Conference on Web and Social Media. Weber's research has been widely covered in the media.

== Research ==
Weber currently works with international agencies on developing new methodologies for monitoring international migration and digital gender gaps.

=== Migration ===
While at Yahoo! Research, Weber pioneered the use of geo-located email login data to study migration and mobility patterns. He has since also analyzed data from Twitter and Google Plus for similar studies.

He now works with experts at the European Commission's Joint Research Centre and International Organization for Migration to use Facebook's advertising audience estimates to obtain timely insights into migration flows.

=== Digital Gender Gaps ===
He works with the United Nations Foundation's Data2X initiative to study digital gender gaps, in particular internet access gender gaps. With support by the Data2X initiative he helped create a website for real-time monitoring of different types of digital gender gaps.

== Awards and honors ==
Weber is an ACM Distinguished Member and was awarded an Alexander von Humboldt Professorship in AI. He is a Fellow of the Association for the Advancement of Artificial Intelligence. He has completed over 100 marathons and is a member of the 100 Marathon Club Deutschland.
