= Anne Bouverot =

French business executive (born 1966)

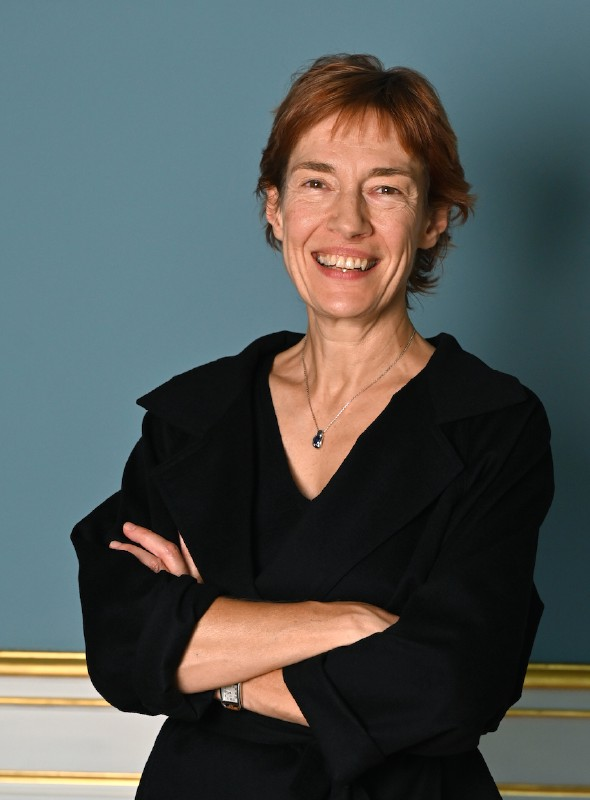
- Anne Bouverot in 2023
- Born: March 21, 1966 (age 60)
- Education: Ecole Normale Supérieure; Telecom ParisTech

Anne Bouverot (French: [buvəʁo]; born 21 March 1966) is a French business executive, engineer, AI researcher, and a philanthropist.

== Education ==
Bouverot attended the Ecole Normale Supérieure in Paris where she studied computer science leading to an M.S. (1985) and later a Ph.D in artificial intelligence (in 1991). She also graduated with a degree in telecommunications from Telecom ParisTech.

== Career ==
In the early 1990s, Bouverot worked as IT project manager for Telmex in Mexico.

From 1996, Bouverot worked for the U.S. company Global One until 2002 when she was appointed vice president at Equant's IT services unit. She worked at Orange for more than 19 years in different positions. In 2004, she was chief of staff to the CEO of Orange in the UK, returning to Paris in 2007 to work on international business development with assignments in Kenya, Armenia, Tunisian and Portugal. She then became executive vice president, mobile services, for France Telecommunications company Orange.

In 2011, Bouverot replaced Rob Conway and was appointed CEO and board member of GSMA, the global association of mobile operators. While she was with GSMA, Bouverot promoted initiatives for attracting more women to work in the mobile and ICT sectors, launching the Connected Women programme which hosts events around the world. She has also been instrumental in organizing the GSMA's Mobile World Congress in Barcelona. Held each year, the event attracts prominent speakers from the mobile and related fields.

In August 2015, Bouverot joined as Chair and CEO, Morpho (subsequently renamed Safran Identity & Security), a company providing biometrics and cryptography solutions for governments and businesses, with 8,600 people in 55 countries and €2B in revenue. Morpho was acquired by Advent International at the end of 2017 and renamed IDEMIA.

In 2018, to reconcile interest in science and technology with a desire to contribute to a fairer society, Bouverot and Tanya Perelmuter co-founded Fondation Abeona. Abeona promotes responsible approach to AI and studies its impact on society.

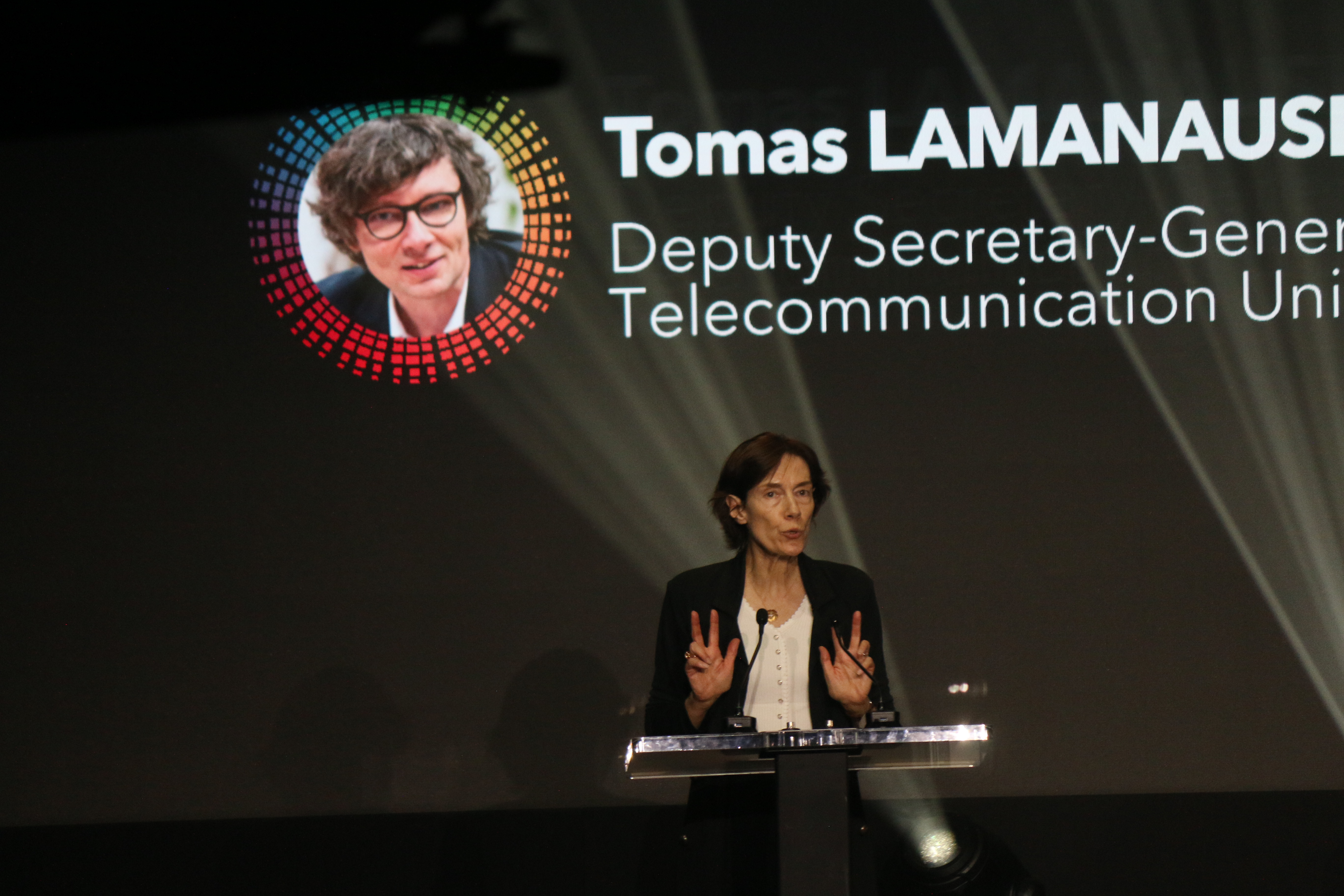
Bouverot at the 2025 AI for Good Summit in Geneva

The foundation created the AI and Social Justice Chair at ENS whose first guest was Dr. Kate Crawford, professor at New York University and co-founder of the AI Now Institute. And it also launched, in partnership with OpenClassrooms and Institut Montaigne, «DestinationAI», a MOOC on risks and opportunities of AI, already followed by more than 300,000 people.

In March 2024, Bouverot and an economist Philippe Aghion presented to the president of France Emmanuel Macron their report on AI technologies and how they could be turned into an engine of the country's economy.

On March 29, 2024, Bouverot was asked by Emmanuel Macron to organise world's next AI Action Summit.

== Other activities ==
- In July 2022, she was appointed the Chair of the Board of Ecole Normale Supérieure.
- She co-chairs, alongside Philippe Aghion, the Committee on Generative Artificial Intelligence, established by Prime Minister Élisabeth Borne.
- In February 2023, Bouverot became President of Series Mania, the biggest event dedicated uniquely to TV and streaming series in Europe.
- She is the Chair of the board of directors of Cellnex, Europe’s leading operator of telecommunications infrastructure, since March 2023, having been a Board member (since 2018).
- On January 4, 2021, she was appointed to the Board of Directors of Thomson Reuters Founders Share Company.
- She is the Chair of Technicolor Creative Studios, a company specialized in visual effects and animation services for entertainment, media, and advertising (since 2019).
- She was a director of Edenred (2010-2021) and Capgemini (2013-2021), she also joined in 2019 the Board of Directors of Ledger, a unicorn and member of the Next 40.
- She has been a senior advisor for TowerBrook Capital Partner since 2018.

== Decorations ==
Anne Bouverot was made Knight of the National Order of Merit and Officer of the Legion of Honor (France).
