= Alessandra Sala =

Italian computer scientist

- Education: University of Salerno
- Occupation: Computer scientist
- Employer(s): Shutterstock; Bell Labs

Alessandra Sala is an Italian computer scientist specializing in distributed algorithms for graph theory, social network analysis, and data privacy. She works for Shutterstock in Ireland, as the director of AI and Data Science. Formerly, she worked for Bell Labs in Ireland, as head of Analytics Research. She is the global president of Women in AI, a non-profit organization working for gender inclusivity in artificial intelligence, and ambassador for Women in AI Ireland. She is a member of the advisory boards of Ireland's National Centre for Applied Data Analytics and Machine Intelligence (CeADAR) and of the World Ethical Data Forum.

She is the 2021 winner of the XV International Prize "Le Tecnovisionarie" in the AI - Industrial Research category. "Le Tecnovisionarie" are women who in their professional activities have demonstrated technological vision and foresight, with an emphasis towards social impact and ethical and transparent behaviors.

Sala is originally from Amalfi. She earned a laurea in computer science from the University of Salerno in 2004, and completed a doctorate there under the supervision of Alberto Negro and Vittorio Scarano. After postdoctoral research at the University of California, Santa Barbara, she joined Bell Labs in 2012.
