= Jean-Philippe Courtois =

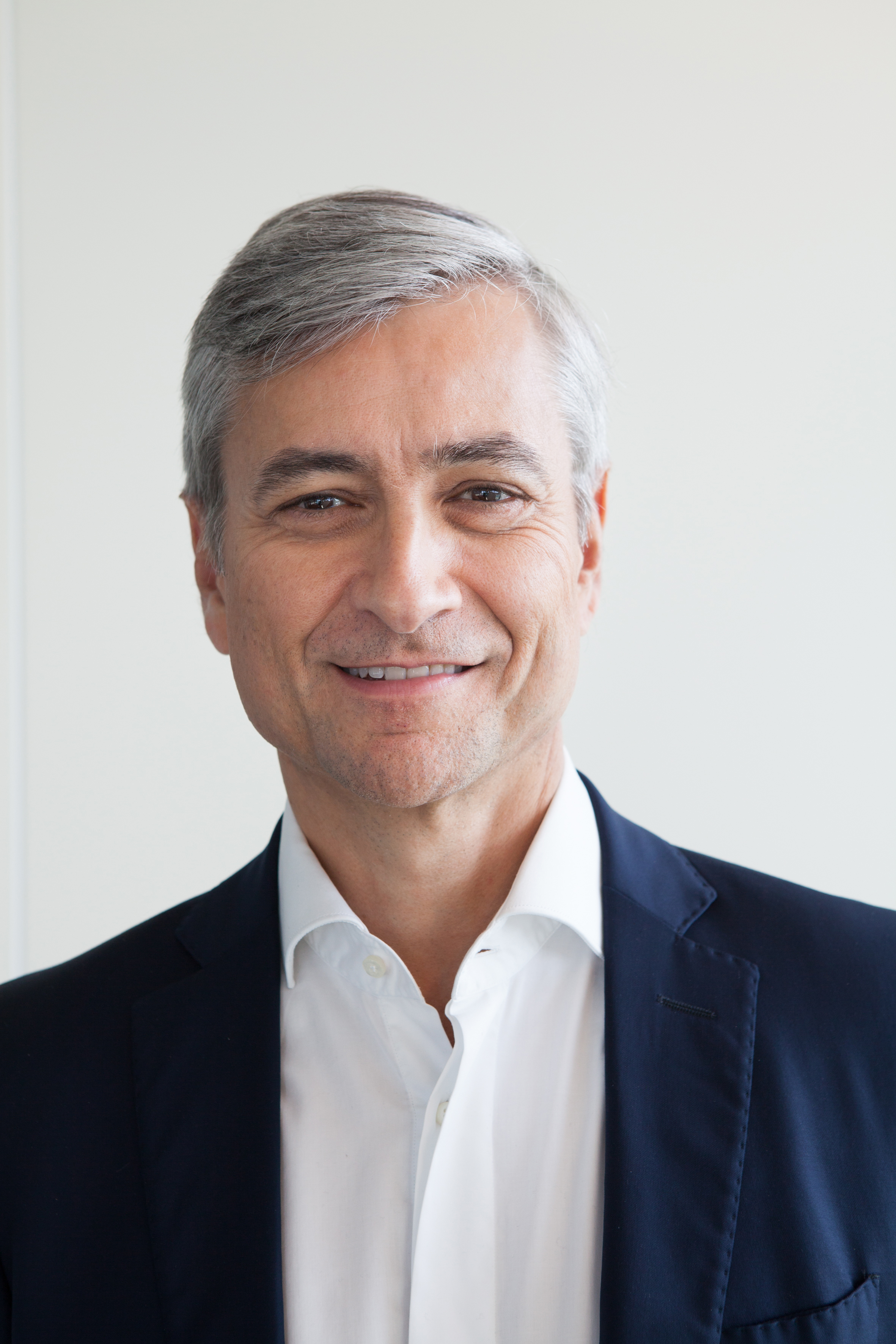
Jean-Philippe Courtois

Jean-Philippe Courtois (French pronunciation: [ʒɑ̃ filip kuʁtwa]; born 1960) was Executive Vice President and President, Microsoft Global Sales, Marketing and Operations. Since 2015, he is also president and co-founder of Live for Good, a French association that aims to help young leaders develop their social or environmental projects.

A French national, Courtois holds a DECS (diplôme des études commerciales supérieures, diploma in advanced business studies) from Skema Business School. He joined Microsoft in 1984 as a sales representative and rose to become general manager of Microsoft France in 1994. Later he was vice-president of worldwide marketing, based at Microsoft's headquarters at Redmond, Washington. He was subsequently CEO and president of Microsoft Europe, Middle East and Africa, then Executive Vice President and President - Microsoft Global Sales, Marketing and Operations of the Company. When Courtois took control of Microsoft's global sales, he launched an initiative that shifted the focus of the company towards cloud computing. The initiative became one of Microsoft's biggest change program and involved over 40,000 employees.

Jean-Philippe Courtois is also a director of PlaNet Finance and Microsoft's representative at the Institut Montaigne. He has served as co-chair of the World Economic Forum's Global Digital Divide Initiative Task Force.
