= ITU-D =

The ITU Telecommunication Development Sector (ITU-D) is one of the three sectors (divisions or units) of the International Telecommunication Union (ITU); it is responsible for creating policies, regulation and providing training programs and financial strategies in developing countries.

Created in 1992, its secretariat is the Bureau de développement des télécommunications (BDT), known in English as the Telecommunication Development Bureau.
