= Plenipotentiary Conference =

The expression Plenipotentiary Conference (of conference of plenipotentiaries) is used to refer to some diplomatic conference integrated by diplomats invested with the full power of independent action on behalf of their country's government. In the United Nations system, the UN Economic and Social Council is vested with the power to call plenipotentiary conferences under Article 62(4) of the Charter of the United Nations.

Notable plenipotentiary conferences include:

- The Berlin Conference of 1884–1885, also known as Congo Conference or West Africa Conference,
- The International Meridian Conference of 1884,
- The "International Plenipotentiary Conference to Conclude an International Convention on Trade in Certain Species of Wildlife" which adopted the Convention on International Trade in Endangered Species,
- The United Nations Conference on Narcotic Drugs, which adopted the Single Convention on Narcotic Drugs, 1961,
- The Rio Earth Summit (officially "United Nations Conference on Environment and Development") was a plenipotentiary conference which adopted 3 treaties: the United Nations Framework Convention on Climate Change, the Convention on Biological Diversity, and the United Nations Convention to Combat Desertification.
- The United Nations Diplomatic Conference of Plenipotentiaries on the establishment of the International Criminal Court, held in Rome, July 1998.

== Plenipotentiary Conference of the International Telecommunication Union ==
Notably, the supreme organ of the International Telecommunication Union (ITU), which meets every four years, is referred to as the "Plenipotentiary Conference."Diplomatic in Nature"

== See also ==
- Plenipotentiary
- ITU Plenipotentiary Conference
- Diplomatic conference
- Treaty
