= Houlin Zhao =

Secretary-General of the International Telecommunication Union

- 赵厚麟
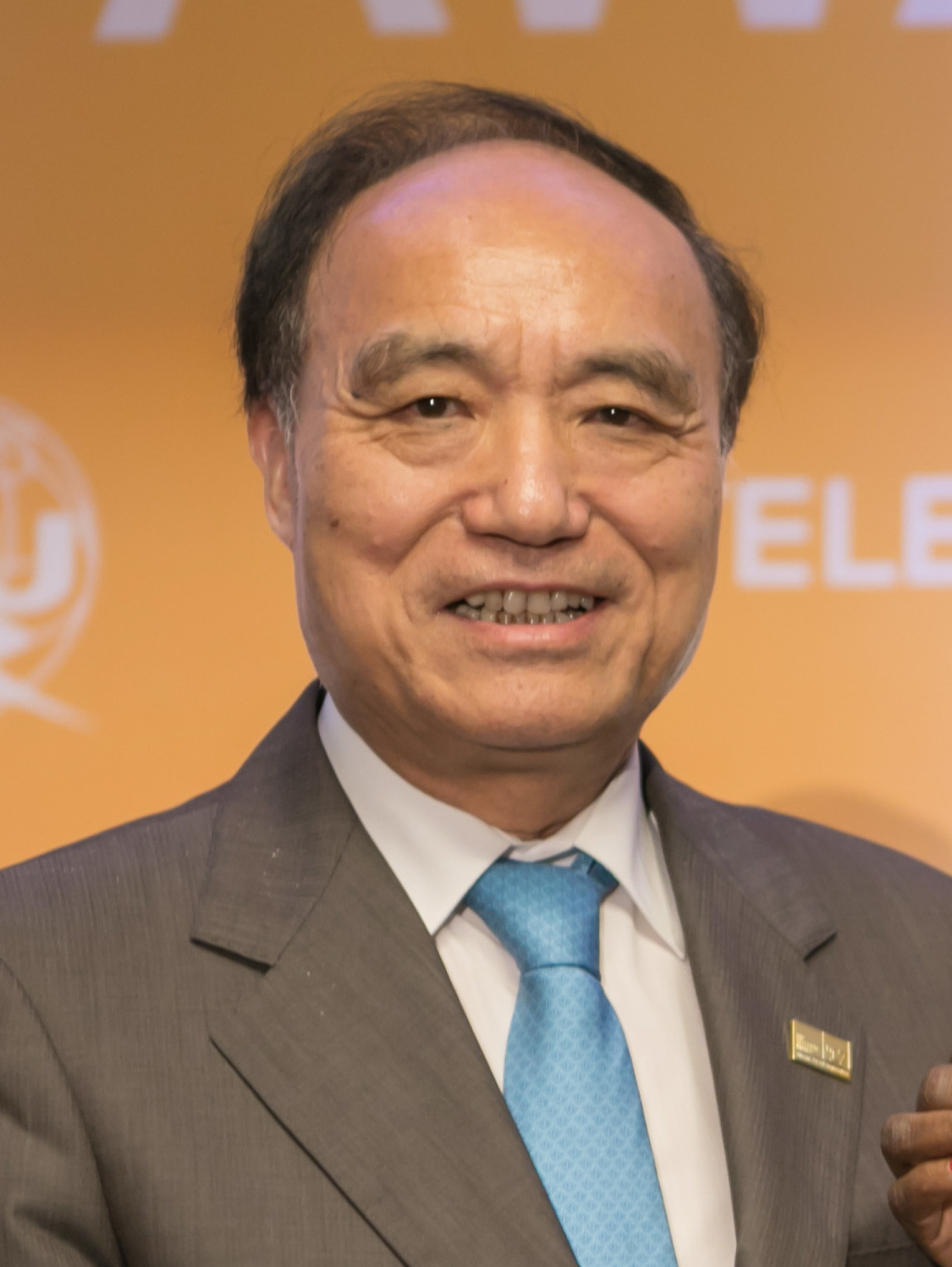
- Zhao in 2017

Secretary-General of the ITU
- In office 1 January 2015 – 31 December 2022
- Preceded by: Hamadoun Touré
- Succeeded by: Doreen Bogdan-Martin

Deputy Secretary-General of the ITU
- In office 1 January 2007 – 31 December 2014
- Preceded by: Hamadoun Touré
- Succeeded by: Malcolm Johnson

Director of the ITU's Standardization Bureau

Personal details
- Born: 7 March 1950 (age 76) Gaoyou, Jiangsu, China
- Education: The University of Essex, UK; The Nanjing University of Posts and Telecommunications, China

Houlin Zhao
- Simplified Chinese: 赵厚麟
- Traditional Chinese: 趙厚麟
Transcriptions
Standard Mandarin
- Hanyu Pinyin: Zhào Hòulín

Houlin Zhao (Chinese: 赵厚麟; pinyin: Zhào Hòulín; born 7 March 1950) is a Chinese engineer who served as the Secretary-General of the International Telecommunication Union (ITU) from 2015 to 2022. He was first elected at the 2014 Plenipotentiary Conference in Busan, and re-elected at the 2018 Plenipotentiary Conference in Dubai. The ITU is the specialized United Nations Agency for Information and Communication Technology (ICT), working on promotion, collaboration, and standardization.

== Background ==
Zhao was born on 7 March 1950 in Gaoyou, Yangzhou in Jiangsu province. Houlin Zhao graduated from the Nanjing University of Posts and Telecommunications, and holds a Master of Science degree in Telematics from the University of Essex, UK. He is married and has one son and two grandchildren. He is fluent in three of the official UN languages – English, French and Chinese.

== Early career ==
From 1986 to 1992, Zhao was a senior staff member in what was then the International Telegraph and Telephone Consultative Committee (known under its French acronym CCITT), and from 1993 to 1998 in ITU's Telecommunication Standardization Bureau, TSB.

Before joining ITU, Zhao served as an engineer in the Design Institute of the Ministry of Posts and Telecommunications of China, taking an active role in his country's expert meetings on telecommunication standards and national plans, as well as participating in ITU's technical Study Group meetings as a Chinese delegate. He contributed seminal articles to a number of prestigious Chinese technical publications, and in 1985 was awarded a prize for his achievements in science and technology with the Ministry of Posts and Telecommunications.

Zhao was elected Director of ITU's Telecommunication Standardization Bureau in Minneapolis, USA in 1998 and re-elected for a second term in Marrakech, Morocco in 2002. During this period, he led consensus based discussions between ITU, the International Organization for Standardization (ISO), and the International Electrotechnical Commission (IEC) on developing and publishing 'common terms' on 'technically aligned texts' of standards of these organizations, harmonizing policy approaches to intellectual property rights. This led to the adoption of a Common Patent Policy for ITU/ISO/IEC still in use today.

During his term of office, he also spearheaded the introduction of new efficiency measures to improve ITU's standards-making environment and strengthen its promotion.

He enhanced the strategic partnership(s) between Member States and Sector Members, while initiating and maintaining good relationships with industry members. Under his leadership, ITU enhanced its level of international cooperation with other standards development organizations, and was instrumental in helping bridge the standardization gap between developing and developed countries.

== ITU Deputy Secretary-General ==
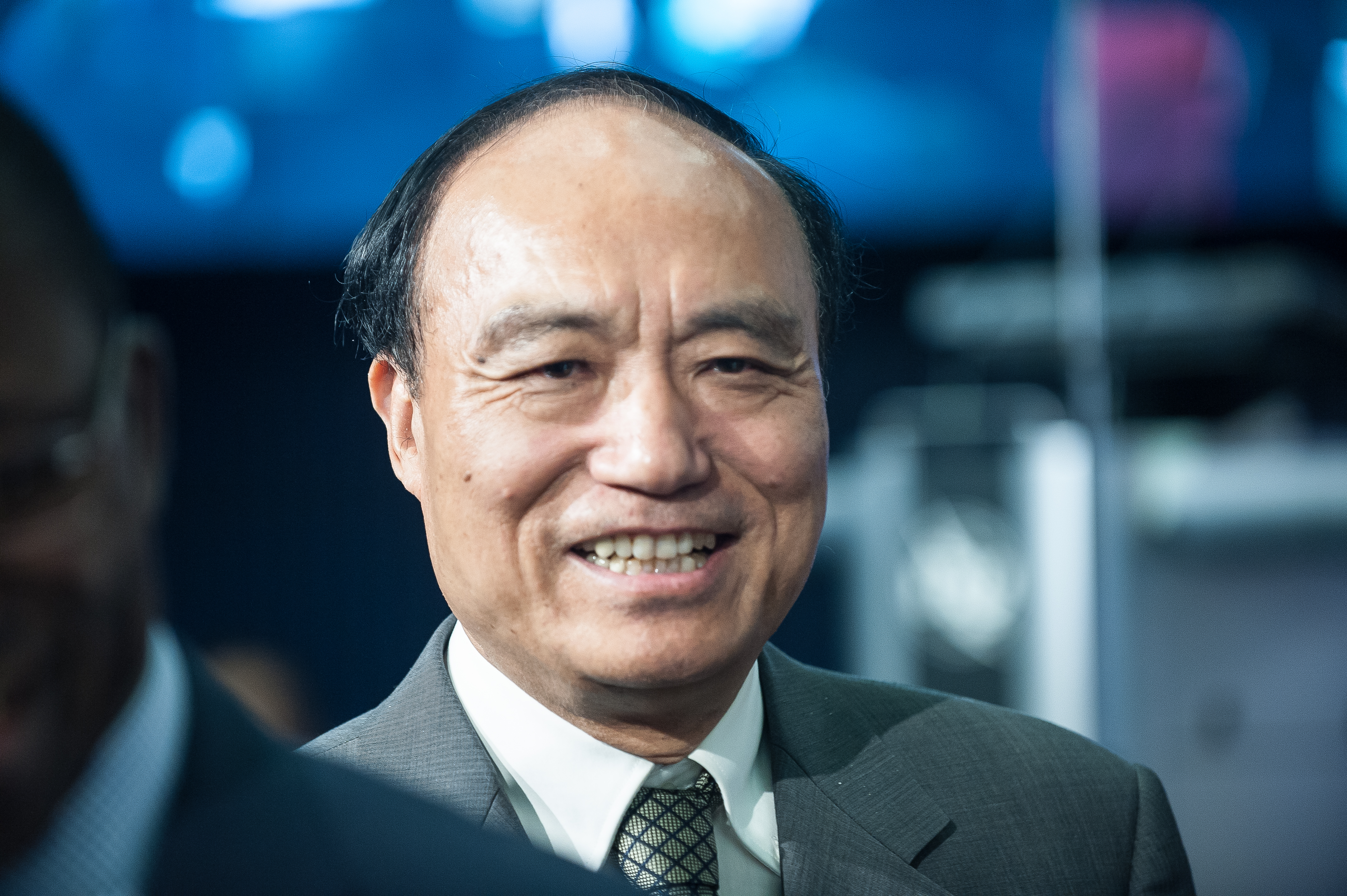
Zhao, then-Deputy Secretary-General, in 2013

Houlin Zhao was elected ITU Deputy Secretary-General at the ITU Plenipotentiary Conference in Antalya, Turkey, in 2006, and was re-elected for a second four-year term at the Plenipotentiary Conference in Guadalajara, Mexico, in 2010.

As Deputy Secretary-General, he assisted the Secretary-General, Dr. Hamadoun I. Touré, and coordinated with the other elected officials in successfully managing ITU's activities and strategies, and maintaining good contacts with members, both national delegations and industry members.

He oversaw the intersectoral coordination of projects and programmes on areas such as the World Summit on the Information Society (WSIS) process, climate change and emergency telecommunications, and accessibility for persons with disabilities (PwD). He also supervised membership reform with the introduction of academic institutions to ITU's membership, implemented 'market price' and 'membership priorities'.

He also led an ITU delegation to participate in the United Nations Conference on Sustainable Development (Rio+20), held in Brazil, in June 2012. The resulting outcome document — "The Future We Want" — repeatedly highlights the importance of ICT for sustainable development and underlines the need to improve access to ICT, especially broadband networks and services, and to bridge the digital divide.

== The ITU's Secretary-General ==
Mr Zhao was elected ITU's Secretary-General on 23 October 2014. Speaking after his election, Mr Zhao said, "I feel deeply moved that you have unanimously and enthusiastically elected me as the new Secretary-General of ITU, entrusting me the honour of leading our beloved organization for the next four years. I sincerely thank all of you for your confidence in me."

Addressing the conference after the vote, Zhao told some 2,000 conference participants from around the world that he would do his best to "fulfil ITU's mission, and, through our close cooperation, ensure ITU delivers services to the global telecommunication and information society at the highest level of excellence."

According to a pre-election interview with ITU News, Zhao's top priorities as ITU's Secretary-General are: Its membership, effectiveness and ICT promotion.

At the 2018 Plenipotentiary Conference in Dubai, Zhao was reelected for a second term at Secretary-General.
