= Killing baby Hitler =

Ethical and physical thought experiment

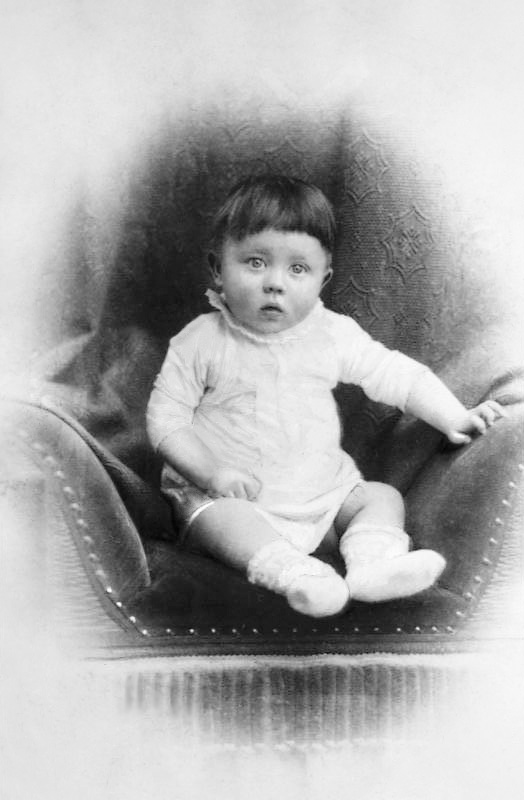
Adolf Hitler as an infant (c. 1889–1890)

Killing baby Hitler is a thought experiment in ethics and theoretical physics which poses the question of using backwards time travel to assassinate an infant Adolf Hitler. It presents an ethical dilemma in both the action and its consequences, as well as a temporal paradox in the logical consistency of time. Killing baby Hitler first became a literary trope of science fiction during World War II and has since been used to explore these ethical and metaphysical debates.

Ethical debates on the problem of killing baby Hitler can demonstrate the outlook of various moral philosophies: utilitarianism holds that killing baby Hitler is justified, as the potential benefits outweigh the potential costs; deontology holds that killing baby Hitler is unjustified, as infanticide is always wrong; and consequentialism may question what the consequences of killing baby Hitler might be, holding that the unforeseen future consequences of such an act make it difficult to judge its morality. It is also used to raise the question of nature versus nurture, whether changing the society that baby Hitler grew up in might be preferable to killing baby Hitler.

Metaphysical debates about the possibility of killing baby Hitler have been used to discuss different philosophies of time: the B-theory of time considers killing baby Hitler to be impossible due to its inherent temporal paradox, while theories of multiple time dimensions leave room for the past to be changed by killing baby Hitler.

Public debate around the question of killing baby Hitler reached its height in late 2015, after The New York Times published a poll asking its readers the question. Advocates of killing baby Hitler included Florida governor Jeb Bush and film actor Tom Hanks, while comedian Stephen Colbert and pundit Ben Shapiro were counted among the opponents of the policy.

== Literary trope ==
Killing baby Hitler is a common literary trope of contemporary science fiction, usually depicting a time traveler going back to the 1890s to assassinate an infant Hitler before he can start World War II and perpetrate the Holocaust. Stories of this kind date as far back as World War II itself, with publications in Weird Tales (1941) and Astounding Science Fiction (1942) including the trope.

Stories in the sub-genre detail a variety of different consequences for killing baby Hitler. In his 1995 short story "Dieu porte-t-il des lunettes noires?" (English: "Does God Wear Dark Glasses?"), Maurice G. Dantec presents an ethical dilemma in travelling through time to kill baby Hitler. In his 1996 novel Making History, Stephen Fry depicts a history student travelling back in time and rendering Alois Hitler infertile. But in the place of Adolf Hitler, a different and more effective Nazi dictator takes power, defeats the Soviet Union with nuclear weapons, conquers Europe and exterminates the Jewish people. In Selden Edwards' 2008 novel The Little Book, the protagonists find themselves back in 1890s Vienna and decide to assassinate a young Hitler, but find themselves unable to kill an "innocent boy", despite knowing what he would grow up to become. In a 2015 short story, American humourist Alexandra Petri depicted Hitler being abducted and raised well by a kindly time traveler. In a post-credits scene of the 2018 film Deadpool 2, the titular character goes back in time to kill baby Hitler, but the outcome is not shown. In the extended cut, the film shows Deadpool realising he can not do it and changing baby Hitler's diaper.

In order to avoid the "Hitler-murder paradox", some science fiction stories follow the Novikov self-consistency principle, which holds that if time travel is possible, then changing the past cannot meaningfully alter the future. In the 1977 novella The Primal Solution, an elderly Holocaust survivor travels through time and attempts to kill a young Hitler, but he survives and is set down the path of antisemitism by the experience. In a 2002 episode of The Twilight Zone, "Cradle of Darkness", a woman travels through time and kills baby Hitler, but another baby is adopted by Hitler's mother and grows up to do all the same things as Hitler. An earlier episode of The Twilight Zone, "No Time Like the Past" (1963), depicts a time traveler failing to assassinate Hitler, in keeping with the self-consistency principle. In Juliusz Machulski's 2013 film AmbaSSada, the protagonists get transported back in time and meet Hitler due to a coincidence, only spontaneously deciding to kill him. As they had not travelled in time with the intention of killing Hitler, the "Hitler's Murder Paradox" is avoided and history is consequently altered.

== Ethical thought experiment ==
=== Consequentialist argument ===
According to consequentialism, the morality of any given action is judged solely by its consequences. Consequentialist ethics raises the dichotomy of immediate foreseeable consequences versus unforeseeable potential consequences; for example, in the story of Johann Kühberger saving a young Hitler from drowning, the immediate positive consequences of saving a person's life was the motivating factor, but it also resulted in the eventual negative consequences of Hitler's rise to power. In a 2000 essay on consequentialism, British philosopher James Lenman posited a German bandit in 100 BCE sparing the life of one of Hitler's distant ancestors. According to consequentialism, although the bandit sparing her life led to the unforeseeable future crimes of Hitler, he was not wrong to do so, as killing her could have led to even worse unforeseeable consequences. Killing baby Hitler also raises the possibility of unforeseen consequences, including the commonly cited possibility that someone even worse than Hitler could rise to power in his place. As the consequences of killing baby Hitler are not known, the problem lacks a clear solution.

=== Deontological argument ===
According to deontology, the morality of an action is determined by certain ethical values, rather than by circumstances. Even in the case that it would benefit the common good, deontology opposes killing out of the belief that all human beings have an "inalienable value". Deontological ethics thus argues against killing baby Hitler, as it considers killing babies to always be wrong, irrespective of any potential consequences.

=== Utilitarian argument ===
Utilitarianism is a moral philosophy that argues for the maximisation of happiness and the minimisation of suffering. According to utilitarian ethics, killing baby Hitler is justified, as it considers the potential benefits to be greater than the moral cost. As Hitler was responsible for the suffering of millions of people, utilitarianism posits that killing one baby Hitler is justifiable in order to save millions of innocent lives. In this way, the question of killing baby Hitler resembles the trolley problem, which utilitarianism responds to similarly. Arguments against the utilitarian response conclude that focusing on killing baby Hitler, without any guarantee of preventing future suffering, means that the only guaranteed outcome is that the time traveller would have committed the moral evil of infanticide. American philosopher Janet Stemwedel therefore considers killing baby Hitler to be an unreliable means for maximising happiness. Stemwedel posits that applying utilitarian ethics to time travel favours causation over human agency, disregarding the capacity for humans to choose different paths and change.

=== Nature versus nurture ===
To Canadian psychologist Julia Shaw, the answer one gives to the baby Hitler question is telling of their view on nature versus nurture: people who would kill baby Hitler may have a deterministic view of individual predisposition towards evil, while people that would not kill baby Hitler may place higher value on environmental factors of upbringing and social conditions. In a psychoanalysis of Hitler's infancy, Austrian psychiatrist Frederick Redlich found that he was "a fairly normal child" and showed few signs of the genocidal intent or dictatorial tendencies that would characterise his adulthood. As there is no scientific explanation for Hitler's later actions based on his genetics, greater attention is often paid to Hitler's early childhood environment. In a refutation of the great man theory, it can be argued that killing baby Hitler would not eliminate this cultural environment, which would still result in other people growing up to pursue far-right politics and genocidal policies. From this perspective, Janet Stemwedel argues that using time travel to change social conditions would be preferable to infanticide, as it would recognise that the responsibility for Hitler's actions lie not just with him, but also in the collective responsibility of those that raised, followed and elected him.

=== Limitations ===
The moral justification for killing baby Hitler usually rests on the question of whether a child can be held responsible for its future actions before having committed any crimes against humanity yet. A follow-up question can then be posed regarding where the line ends for killing babies that would commit crimes against humanity. The question of where the line ends was brought up by American activist Shaun King, who argued that the logic for killing baby Hitler could just as easily be applied to a newborn Christopher Columbus, infant slave-owners or a young Dylann Roof. Australian moral philosopher Matthew Beard likewise brought up the idea of babies Pol Pot and Joseph Stalin, arguing that a clear set of ethical principles would be needed to determine which historical babies deserve to be killed.

== In theoretical physics ==
The question of killing baby Hitler contains a version of the grandfather paradox, also known as the "Hitler's Murder Paradox". According to the B-theory of time, if someone travelled back in time with the intention of killing baby Hitler, then their reason for travelling back in time would be eliminated. It is often concluded that as the past has already happened, alteration of the past is a logical impossibility. As Hitler killed himself in 1945, it can also be inferred that no time traveler has killed baby Hitler.

In contrast to the B-theory, models that adopt the A-theory of time avoid logical contradictions in the killing of baby Hitler by considering time to be two-dimensional, where the first dimension is standard time (t_{x}) and the second dimension is known as hyper-time (Ht_{x}). Theories that leave room for the past to be changed include hyper-eternalism, two-dimensional presentism and hyper-presentism, which each demonstrate the possibility of killing baby Hitler in two-dimensional time. In these temporal models, both the past and the future are held to be mutable; in changing the past by killing baby Hitler, the time traveller also changes the future. Although it can also be debated whether such temporal models genuinely change the past, or if killing baby Hitler simply affects the past by causing a variation in hyper-time.

If time travel caused creation of a parallel universe, killing baby Hitler would only create a parallel universe without Hitler in it, and the original universe would continue existing and thus the suffering he caused in that timeline would not be alleviated by the time-traveling assassin. From this perspective, astrophysicist Brian Koberlein concluded that killing baby Hitler would be "inconsequential at best, and could be downright harmful", recommending that time travelers avoid such an activity and instead visit the 1980s.

== Public debate ==
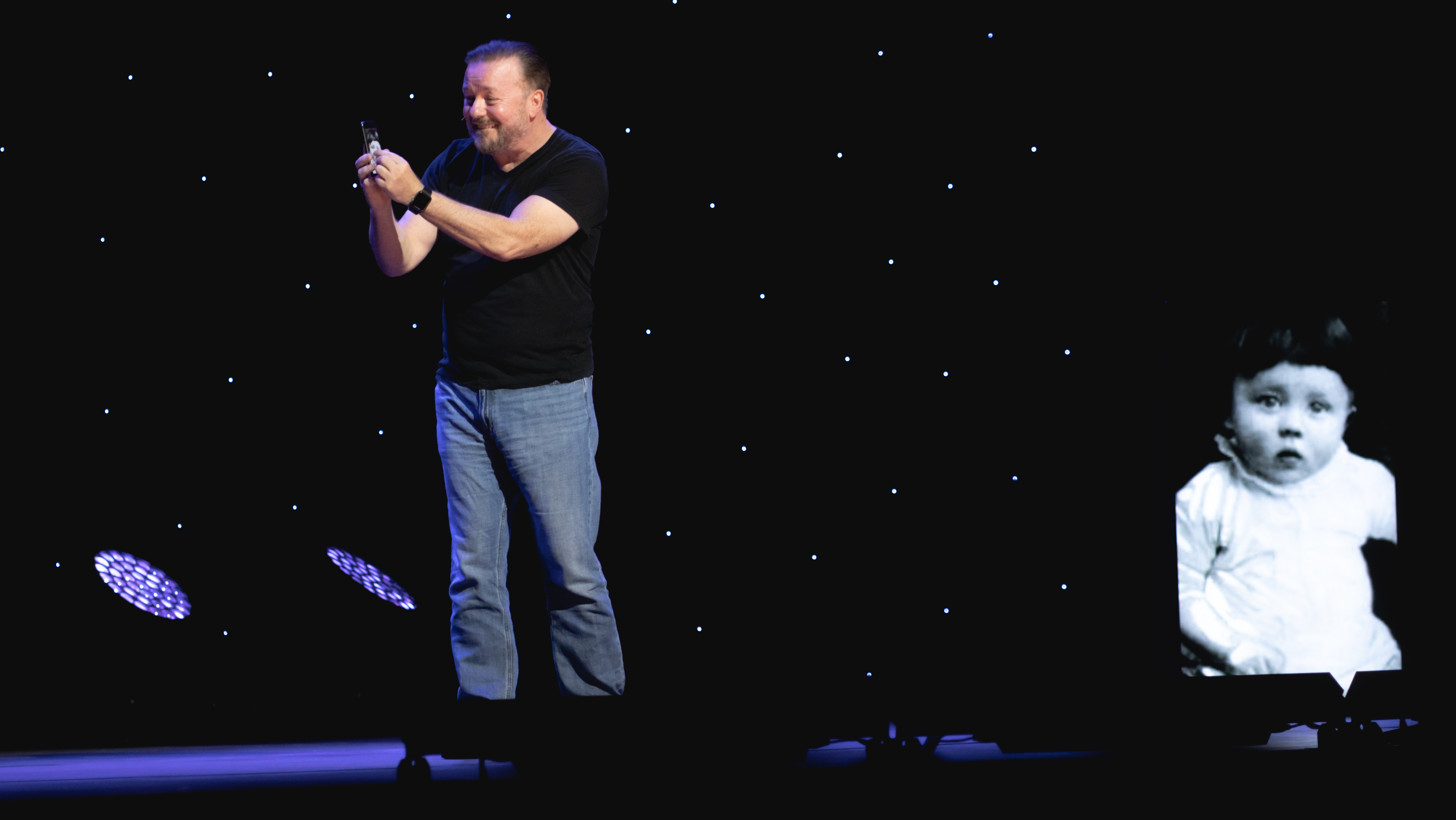
English comedian Ricky Gervais (left) joking about the thought experiment

In conversations about time travel, it is common to raise the subject of changing the past and specifically the question of killing baby Hitler, in what is also known as "Godwin's law of time travel". Public debate on the baby Hitler question was brought to prominence in October 2015, when a poll by The New York Times asked its readers if they would kill baby Hitler. The poll received a plurality of affirmative responses: 42% said they would kill baby Hitler, 30% said they would not and 28% were undecided. The poll caused the hashtag #babyhitler to begin trending on Twitter, as the social media platform's users debated the subject.

During the campaign for the 2016 Republican Party presidential primaries, when the question of killing baby Hitler was posed by journalists of HuffPost to Florida governor Jeb Bush, he responded "Hell Yeah, I Would!". While acknowledging the potential unknown consequences of such an action, he affirmed that he would still do it, saying "You gotta step up, man." The issue of killing baby Hitler was also raised during that year's Democratic Party presidential primaries, with New Hampshire primary novelty candidate Vermin Supreme making it one of the four planks of his political platform. American actor Tom Hanks responded to the political debate by declaring that he would vote for a presidential candidate that supported killing baby Hitler. When the question was posed to Microsoft's chatbot Tay, it likewise replied that "of course" it would kill baby Hitler.

In contrast, American comedian Stephen Colbert responded to the question by saying that he would not kill baby Hitler and would instead seek to raise him in a loving home. In a 2018 interview with The Washington Post, American actor John C. Reilly responded similarly, calling for empathy with baby Hitler as an apolitical alternative. That same year, English comedian Ricky Gervais began telling jokes about the dilemma of killing baby Hitler. At the March for Life in 2019, American conservative pundit Ben Shapiro argued against killing baby Hitler from an anti-abortion position, stating that "Baby Hitler was a baby." His comments drew criticism and mockery from liberal commentators. In response to his position on killing baby Hitler, three companies pulled their advertisements from Shapiro's podcast.

== See also ==
- Genesis and Catastrophe: A True Story, a 1960 short story by Roald Dahl centering on the birth of baby Hitler and the fears that the baby may be too frail to survive
- Historical determinism

== Bibliography ==
=== Book chapters ===
- Bragança, Manuel (2019). "Hitler, from France to the Rest of the World (and Back): Concluding Remarks". Hitler's French Literary Afterlives, 1945–2017. Palgrave Pivot. pp. 101–123. doi:10.1007/978-3-030-21617-7_6. ISBN 978-3-030-21617-7.
- Febel, Giseal; Knopf, Kerstin; Nonhoff, Martin (2023). "Contradiction Studies: Exploring the Field. An Introduction". Contradiction Studies – Exploring the Field. Wiesbaden: Springer VS. pp. 1–74. doi:10.1007/978-3-658-37784-7_1. ISBN 978-3-658-37784-7.
- Kaiserman, Alex (2023). "The logic of past-alteration". In Bennett, Karen; Zimmerman, Dean W. (eds.). Oxford Studies in Metaphysics. Vol. 13. Oxford University Press. pp. 283–314. doi:10.1093/oso/9780192886033.003.0009. ISBN 978-0-19-288603-3.
- Marks, Joel (2016). "None of the Above: What Desirism Isn't (and Is)". Hard Atheism and the Ethics of Desire: An Alternative to Morality. Palgrave Macmillan. pp. 45–90. doi:10.1007/978-3-319-43799-6. ISBN 978-3-319-43798-9.
- Nahin, Paul J. (2017). "Philosophers, Physicists, and the Time Travel Paradoxes". Time Machine Tales: The Science Fiction Adventures and Philosophical Puzzles of Time Travel. Science and Fiction. Springer. pp. 187–244. doi:10.1007/978-3-319-48864-6_4. ISBN 978-3-319-48864-6.
- Olasov, Ian (2020). "Should You Kill Baby Hitler?". Ask a Philosopher: Answers to Your Most Important and Most Unexpected Questions. St. Martin's Publishing Group. ISBN 978-1250756183.
- Rard, Elizabeth (2019). "Lost in Time". In Rivera, Heather L.; Hooke, Alexander E. (eds.). The Twilight Zone and Philosophy: A Dangerous Dimension to Visit. Open Court books. ISBN 978-0-8126-9993-7.
- Shaw, Julia (2019). "Your Inner Sadist: The Neuroscience of Evil". Making Evil: The Science Behind Humanity's Dark Side. Canongate Books. ISBN 978-1-78689-132-7.

=== Journal articles ===
- Alper, Sinan (2020). "Explaining the Complex Effect of Construal Level on Moral and Political Attitudes". Current Directions in Psychological Science. 29 (2): 115–120. doi:10.1177/0963721419896362.
- Andreoletti, Giacomo; Spolaore, Giuseppe (2021). "The future ain't what it used to be". Synthese. 199 (3–4): 10569–10585. doi:10.1007/s11229-021-03259-5. hdl:11577/3397849. ISSN 0039-7857.
- Goddu, G. C. (2024). "Time Travelers (and Everyone Else) Cannot Do Otherwise". Philosophies. 9 (28): 28. doi:10.3390/philosophies9010028. ISSN 2409-9287.
- Grabias, Magdalena (17 July 2023). "Paradoxes of Time Travel in Juliusz Machulski's Cinema". Perspektywy Kultury. 42 (3): 471–486. doi:10.35765/pk.2023.4203.28.
- Vihvelin, Kadri (March 1996). "What time travelers cannot do". Philosophical Studies. 81 (2–3): 315–330. doi:10.1007/BF00372789. JSTOR 4320656.
- Vihvelin, Kadri (2020). "Killing Time Again". The Monist. 103 (3): 312–327. doi:10.1093/monist/onaa006. JSTOR 48739951.

=== News articles ===
- Amanpour, Christiane (12 November 2015). "Would Tom Hanks kill baby Hitler?". CNN.
- Beard, Matthew (1 November 2015). "Would you kill baby Hitler?". The Ethics Centre.
- Blevins, Joe (17 October 2016). "How killing baby Hitler became a staple of time-travel stories". The A.V. Club.
- Concha, Joe (18 January 2019). "Ben Shapiro at March For Life rally: 'No pro-life person would kill baby Hitler'". The Hill.
- Conroy, Scott; Strauss, Jon (9 November 2015). "Jeb Bush On Whether He'd Kill Baby Hitler: 'Hell Yeah, I Would!'". HuffPost.
- Crucchiola, Jordan (21 May 2018). "Deadpool Killed Baby Hitler in a Deleted Scene". Vulture.
- Fisher, Alyssa (23 January 2019). "Ben Shapiro's Advertisers Pull Out Over 'Baby Hitler' Remarks". The Forward.
- Ford, Matt (24 October 2015). "The Ethics of Killing Baby Hitler". The Atlantic.
- Hornshaw, Phil (7 August 2018). "Does Deadpool Kill Baby Hitler in a 'Deadpool 2' Deleted Scene, or Not? Ask Cable". TheWrap.
- Jewell, Hannah (25 September 2018). "John C. Reilly wouldn't kill baby Hitler". The Washington Post.
- King, Shaun (26 October 2016). "'Killing baby Hitler' debate raises questions about horrors in our own country". New York Daily News.
- Kantrowitz, Alex (23 March 2016). "Microsoft's New AI-Powered Chatbot Mimics A 19-Year-Old American Girl". BuzzFeed News.
- Kaplan, Rebecca (10 February 2016). "Vermin Supreme finishes fourth in N.H. Democratic primaries". CBS.
- Koberlein, Brian (23 October 2015). "Why It's Impossible To Go Back In Time And Kill Baby Hitler". Forbes.
- Matthews, Dylan (18 January 2019). "The philosophical problem of killing baby Hitler, explained". Vox.
- Miltimore, Jon (31 October 2022). "Why the Ethics of 'Would You Kill Baby Hitler?' Are More Important Than You Probably Think". Foundation for Economic Education.
- Murphy, Chris (26 May 2022). "The Difference Between Dave Chappelle and Ricky Gervais". Vanity Fair.
- Petri, Alexandra (23 October 2015). "You should not kill Baby Hitler. Try this instead". The Washington Post.
- Stemwedel, Janet D. (24 October 2015). "Why It's Unethical To Go Back In Time And Kill Baby Hitler". Forbes.
- Strauss, Matthew (29 October 2015). "A Philosopher Weighs in on Whether or Not You Should Kill Baby Hitler". Inverse.
