= Maha Jouini =

Tunisian author, human rights defender, and an AI expert

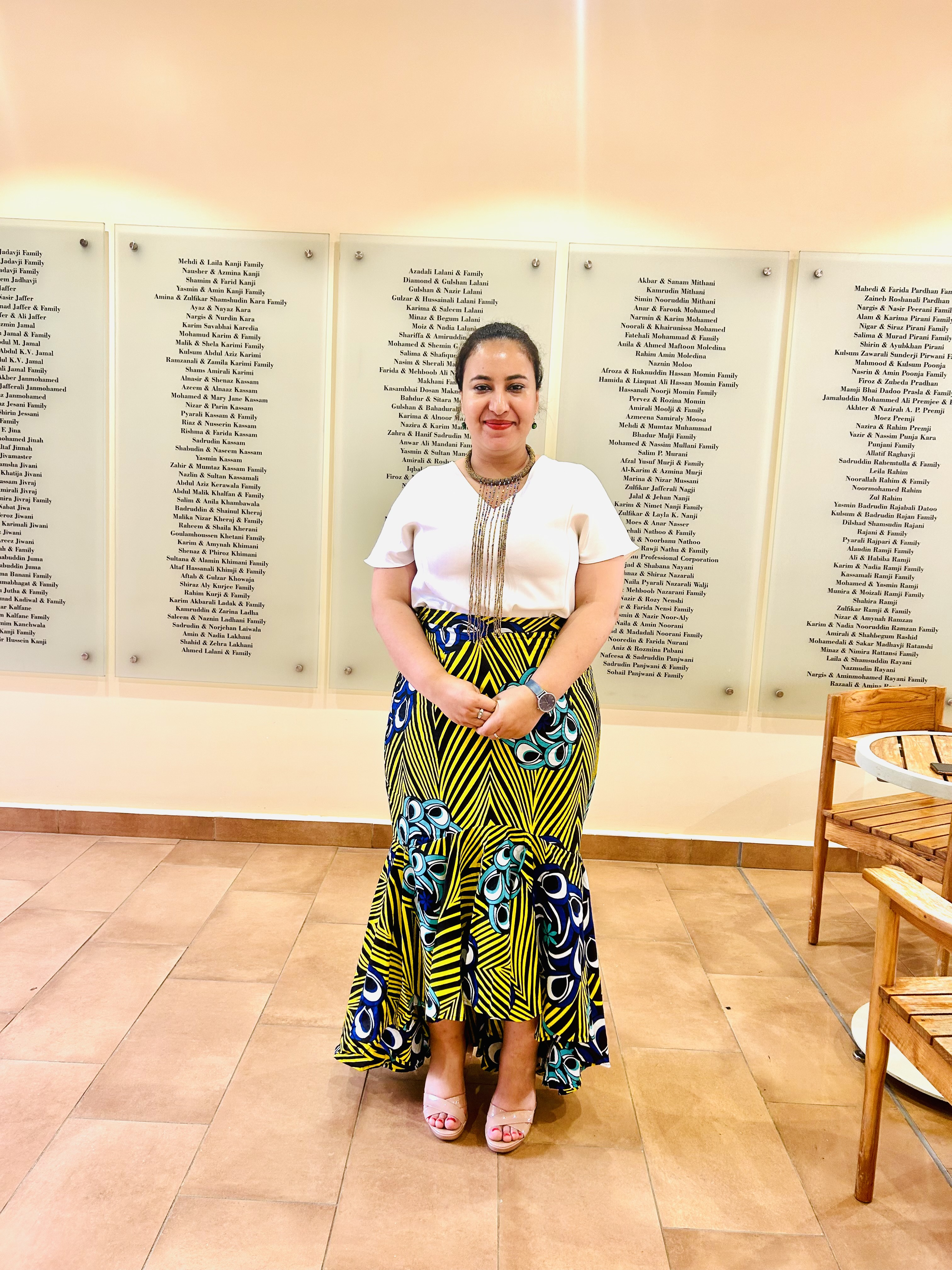
- Born: 1987 (age 38–39); Tunisia
- Education: Center for AI and Digital Policy (AI governance program); University of Cape Town (African AI policy courses)
- Alma mater: Tianjin University of Education and Technology (Master’s in Artificial Intelligence and New Technologies); University of the Witwatersrand (Governance studies); Bachelor’s in French Language and Civilization; Highest Diploma in Computer Science; Master’s in Applied Technology
- Occupations: Author, Blogger, Human Rights Defender, Artificial Intelligence Expert
- Organizations: African Union AI Task Force (Member); African & Francophone Agency for AI (Vice-President); African Union Development Agency – AUDA‑NEPAD (Former Digital Communication Officer); African Center for Artificial Intelligence and Digital Technology (Founder); Responsible AI Hackathon 2023
- Known for: AI policy advocacy; Human rights activism; Sino–African research; AU child marriage campaign
- Notable work: AI and Data Policy in Africa: A Call for Sovereign Innovation; Context-Aware Africa-Led Designing of Responsible AI Technologies
- Awards: Top 20 Women Change‑makers in MENA – UNESCO & Asfari Institute (2022); Top 10 Influential African Women in Technology (2025); Personality of the Year – Maghreb Voices (2018)
- Website: https://mahajouini.tech/

Maha Jouini (born 1987) is a Tunisian author and blogger, a human rights defender, and an artificial intelligence expert who lived in China.

== Background and education ==
She has a Master in Artificial Intelligence and New Technologies from Tianjin University of Education and Technology (China). She studied at the University of the Witwatersrand, focusing on the institutional governance in Africa, particularly within the African Union Commission.

== Career ==
She is a researcher in Artificial Intelligence and art at Tianjin University of Science and Technology where she contributed to Sino-African relations. She was employed as the Digital Communication officer at the African Union Development Agency (AUDA-NEPAD) where she worked in the African Union campaign to end child marriage in Africa as a media coordinator based in Ethiopia from late 2014 to 2017. She is also a member of African Union's AI Task Force with the aim to advance the African Union’s strategy for the ethical use of artificial intelligence in Africa. She is the vice-president of African & Francophone Agency for AI and former researcher at AI Global Index. She was named the personality of the year in 2018 by the Maghreb Voices platform because of her role as a social media influencer. She is known in the Arab region as a human rights defender and has participated in international conferences on women’s and indigenous people’s issues. She was a research fellow at the Global Center on AI Governance. She is the founder of the African Center for Artificial Intelligence and Digital Technology. She also served as the African Regional Coordinator at the Global Responsible AI hackathon 2023 launched by Woman in AI Ethics Initiative. She was the 2015 African School on Internet Governance (AfriSIG) fellow.

== Awards and honours ==
- Top 20 Woman Change makers pioneers in MENA by UNESCO and The Asfari Institute for Civil Society and Citizenship at AUB in 2022.
- Named "Personality of the Year" by Maghreb Voices in 2018.

== Publications ==
- AI and Data Policy in Africa: A Call for Sovereign Innovation
- Context-Aware Africa-Led Designing of Responsible Artificial Intelligence Technologies.
- https://www.tandfonline.com/doi/full/10.1080/13552074.2022.2136432
- Meha Jouini: The internet has allowed me to publicly express my identity as an Amazigh woman activist

== See also ==
- Regulation of Artificial intelligence
- Anja Kaspersen
- Wendell Wallach
- Kiara Nirghin
