= Louise Bourgeois: The Spider, the Mistress, and the Tangerine =

Louise Bourgeois: The Spider, the Mistress and the Tangerine
- Theatrical release poster
- Directed by: Marion Cajori, Amei Wallach
- Produced by: Marion Cajori, George Griffin, Kipjaz Savoie, Amei Wallach
- Starring: Louise Bourgeois
- Cinematography: Mead Hunt, Ken Kobland
- Edited by: Ken Kobland
- Music by: Carmen Borgia
- Distributed by: Zeitgeist Films
- Release date: June 25, 2008
- Running time: 99 minutes
- Country: United States
- Language: English

Louise Bourgeois: The Spider, the Mistress and the Tangerine is a 2008 documentary film about artist and sculptor Louise Bourgeois directed by Marion Cajori and Amei Wallach and distributed by Zeitgeist Films.

== Synopsis ==
Louise Bourgeois: The Spider, the Mistress and the Tangerine chronicles the life and imagination of Paris-born artist Louise Bourgeois. Her process is on full display in this documentary, which features the artist in her studio and with her installations, shedding light on her intentions and inspirations. Throughout the documentary, Bourgeois reveals her life and work to be imbued with her ongoing obsession with the mysteries of childhood. Bourgeois has for six decades been an important and influential figure in the world of modern art. In 1982, at the age of 71, she became the first woman to be honored with a major retrospective at New York's Museum of Modern Art. She is perhaps best known for her series of massive spider structures that have been installed around the world. Filmed with unprecedented access to the artist between 1993 and 2007, Louise Bourgeois: The Spider, the Mistress and the Tangerine is a comprehensive examination of the creative process.

== Music ==
In several places, the film contains an excerpt from the song O Superman by Laurie Anderson. The last part of the song, beginning with the line So hold me Mom, is used in correspondence to Bourgeois' theme of depicting the mother figure with spider sculptures.

During the credits, a remix of a song called Otte, written and sung by Louise Bourgeois herself, is heard. The film also shows her amused reaction to hearing herself singing this song.

== Reception ==
The film has received mostly positive reviews, with 92% of critics responding with positive reviews at T-metric section of Rotten Tomatoes.

== DVD release ==
Louise Bourgeois: The Spider, The Mistress and the Tangerine was released on DVD by Zeitgeist Films June 23, 2009.
