= Kaspersen =

Kaspersen is a surname. Notable people with the surname include:

- Anja Kaspersen (fl. 2017), Norwegian political scientist
- Kjell Kaspersen (1939–2025), Norwegian footballer
- Konrad Kaspersen (born 1948), Norwegian jazz musician
- Kristin Kaspersen (born 1969), Swedish-Norwegian television host
