= Amei Wallach =

American filmmaker and author

Amei Wallach is an American film director, producer, art critic journalist, and author from New York. Her documentaries profiling artists include: Louise Bourgeois: The Spider, The Mistress and the Tangerine (2008), Ilya and Emilia Kabakov: Enter Here (2013), and Taking Venice (release date May 17, 2024) . Her writings have appeared in the New York Times, Smithsonian, Vanity Fair, and Art in America, and numerous publications. From 2000 to 2005, Wallach served as president of the U.S. Section of the International Association of Art Critics (AICA/USA).

== Early life and education ==
Amei Wallach was raised in Goshen, Connecticut by German-Jewish immigrants.

Wallach graduated from the George School, a private boarding high school, in Newtown, Bucks County, Pennsylvania. Wallach attended the University of Chicago, withdrew to pursue acting in New York, and completed her Bachelor of Science at the Columbia University School of General Studies.

=== Family ===
Her mother Gerda Wilhelmina Lewenz (April 7, 1915 – October 12, 2000) was born in Berlin, Germany in the middle of World War I. Both sides of Gerda's family were "prominent" Jewish bankers. Gerda was "deeply" involved in the German peace movement and was a peace activist the rest of her life. Dinner table contests took place over who was the greatest writer, Shakespeare or Goethe; all of her children would become researchers, and published authors. Gerda studied art history in Florence, Italy; in the U.S. she would own the Litchfield Gallery, and continued to curate art shows throughout her life. Back in Germany in 1936, she trained to become a nurse in Hamburg, where she met and married Dr. Gert M.K. (GMK) Wallach who was also a German Jew.

In 1938 and 1939, they separately fled to New York, settling in Goshen. Gert opened a doctor's office, and served as Director of Health for Goshen, for which he received a Public Health Award. He later took a position as health officer and as clinician based in Chattanooga, Tennessee for the Georgia-Tennessee Health Authority serving Appalachia and was the Director of Health of Waterbury, Connecticut until his death. Gerda also continued her work as a nurse. Before she died she was featured in the documentary Letter Without Words (1998), a PBS film about her family's life in Germany from World War I (1914–1918) to flight from Nazi Germany in the 1930s.

Amei Wallach had two siblings. Wendell Wallach attended Harvard Divinity School. H.G. Peter Wallach was an author and "political scientist specializing in American Constitutional law, and contemporary German politics", who died in 1995.

== Career ==
Wallach worked as Chief Art Critic for Newsday and New York Newsday from 1984 to 1995, and was an on-air arts essayist for the MacNeil-Lehrer NewsHour, later renamed PBS NewsHour, from 1987 to 1995. As an art critic, Wallach's articles have appeared in The New York Times, The New York Times Magazine, The Nation, Smithsonian, Vanity Fair, Vogue, Art in America, ARTnews, Aperture, Parkett and The Brooklyn Rail.

Wallach has interviewed and profiled artists ranging from Salvador Dalí to Willem de Kooning and Jeff Koons. She profiled Anselm Kiefer in 1988, David Hammons in 1991, and in October 2001, weeks after the World Trade Center Bombings, Wallach's essay on the Iranian-born artist Shirin Neshat was featured on the cover of Art in America.

From 2000 to 2005, Wallach was president of AICA/USA, the U.S. Section of the International Association of Art Critics, or Association Internationale des Critiques d'Art, and as of 2020, continues on its board. She also serves on the board of CEC ArtsLink, and was a founding member of ArtTable, an association of leading women in the arts. Wallach is the founding director of The Art Writing Workshop; a partnership between the International Art Critics Association (AICA/USA) and the Creative Capital Warhol Foundation Arts Writers Grant Program.

== Film work ==
In 2008 Wallach co-directed and co-produced Louise Bourgeois: The Spider, the Mistress, and the Tangerine with Marion Cajori. Filmed over 14 years (from 1993 to 2007), the work is a documentary portrait of the sculptor Louise Bourgeois and her career, which spanned the 20th and early 21st century. The New York Times called the film a "Superb documentary portrait", and it originally garnered a 92% in positive reviews on Rotten Tomatoes.

In 2013 Wallach directed Ilya and Emilia Kabakov: Enter Here, which debuted at the New York Film Forum, and had its Canadian premiere at the Vancouver International Film Festival. The film explores the history of the artist, born in Ukraine under Joseph Stalin, and his years as an outsider artist forbidden to exhibit in Moscow. It culminates in 2008 with the artists’ first public exhibition in Moscow, in venues throughout the city, including the Pushkin Museum.

Her latest documentary film, Taking Venice, premiered on May 17, 2024, at the IFC Theater in New York City, having shown at international film festivals in Rome, Italy; São Paulo, Brazil; New York, Boulder, and Palm Beach. Taking Venice uncovers the story behind rumors that the U.S. Government and a team of high-placed insiders rigged the 1964 Venice Biennale, so their chosen artist Robert Rauschenberg could win the Grand Prize.

== Personal life ==
In September 1989 Wallach wed William P. Edwards, former Museum of Modern Art Deputy Director of Auxiliary Activities, chief executive officer of the Museum Store Company, a gift store chain, and former Southold Town Board Member. This is a second marriage for both parties.

Wendell Wallach, her brother, is a lecturer at Yale University’s Interdisciplinary Center for Bioethics, and chair of the technology and ethics study group.

== Works ==
=== Books ===
- Ilya Kabakov: The Man Who Never Threw Anything Away
- Reflections of Nature: Paintings by Joseph Raffael'
- Gee's Bend: The Architecture of the Quilt
- Louise Bourgeois

=== Films ===
- Louise Bourgeois: The Spider, the Mistress, and the Tangerine with Marion Cajori.
- Ilya and Emilia Kabakov: Enter Here.
- Taking Venice, world premiere at the Rome International Film Festival in 2023.

== Awards ==
Wallach was awarded the National Endowment for the Arts Professional Journalism Fellowship at Stanford University, later renamed the John S. Knight Fellowship, in 1984.

In 2006, Wallach won a "Best Show in a Temporary or Alternative Space" award for her exhibition Neo-Sincerity: The Difference Between the Comic and the Cosmic Is a Single Letter, from the International Art Critics Association/USA.
