= Kiara Nirghin =

South African inventor, scientist and speaker

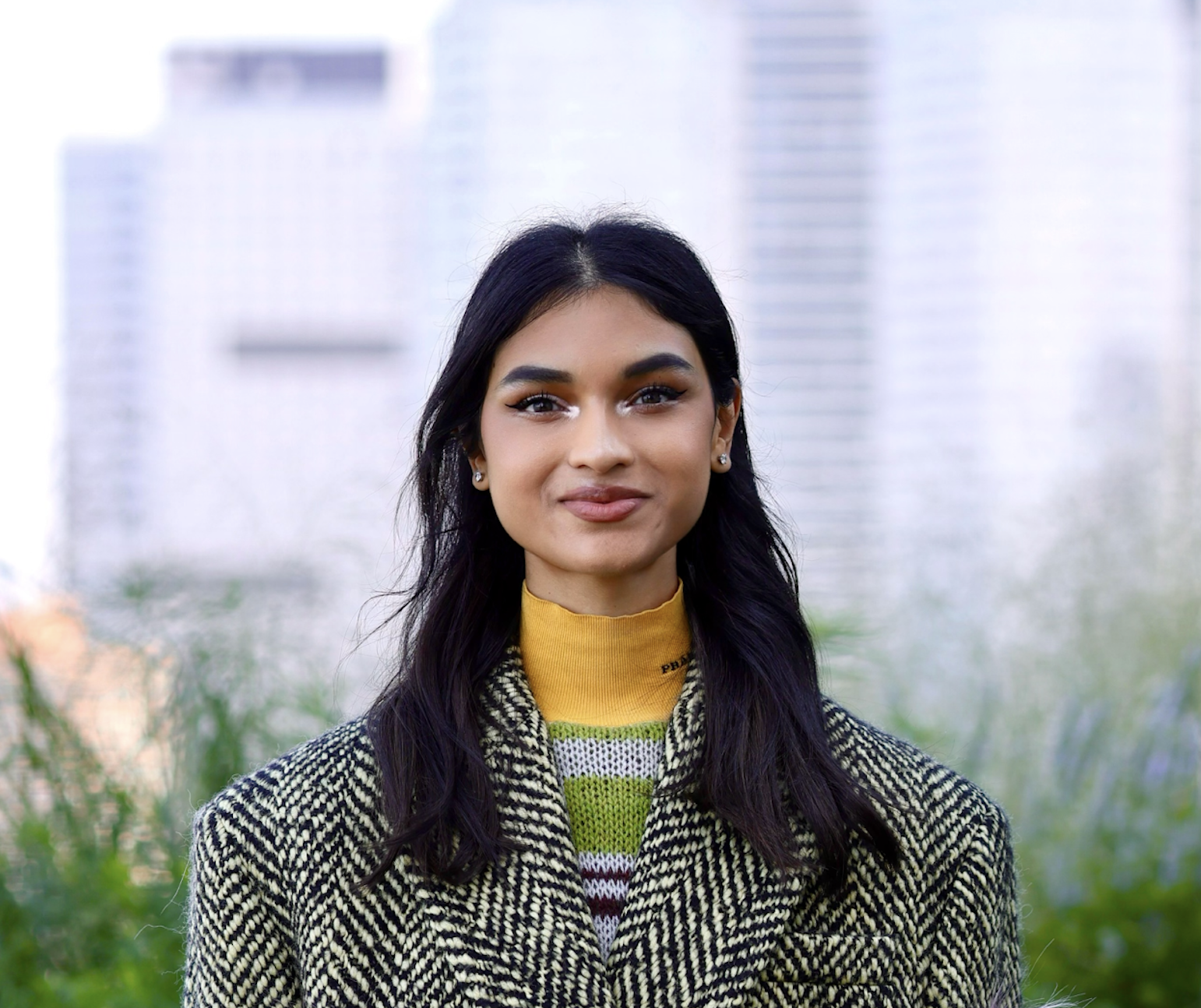
- Education: Stanford University
- Known for: Artificial Intelligence.
- Awards: Grand Prize at the Google Science Fair Global Google Community Impact Award Winner Time Magazine's Most Influential

Kiara Nirghin is a tech entrepreneur and AI technologist originally from South Africa. Nirghin has been featured by TIME Magazine and The Guardian on their Most Influential lists and named one of Glamour Magazine’s Women of the Year. She has also been on Forbes 30 Under 30. She is recognized as a United Nations' Young Champions of the Earth and is a Global Ambassador for Room To Read.

== Career ==
Nirghin is a Thiel Fellow and a Fellow of Alexis Ohanian's 776 Foundation. She is one of the youngest AI executives in Silicon Valley. Specializing in researching and building generative AI models, she co-funded Chima, a company using large-scale, venture-backed technology with a focus on sustainability and ethical practices.

Nirghin advocates through public and private organizations UN Women, L'Oréal UNESCO for Women in Science, and The Academy of Motion Picture Arts and Sciences. She is also a Global Ambassador for Room To Read and served as the youngest member of Google's AI Impact Fund.

Nirghin has partnered with Coca-Cola on their Dreamworld project, which explores the intersection of creativity and technology. She has collaborated with Prada in presenting the Oceans Award at the CNMI Sustainable Awards.

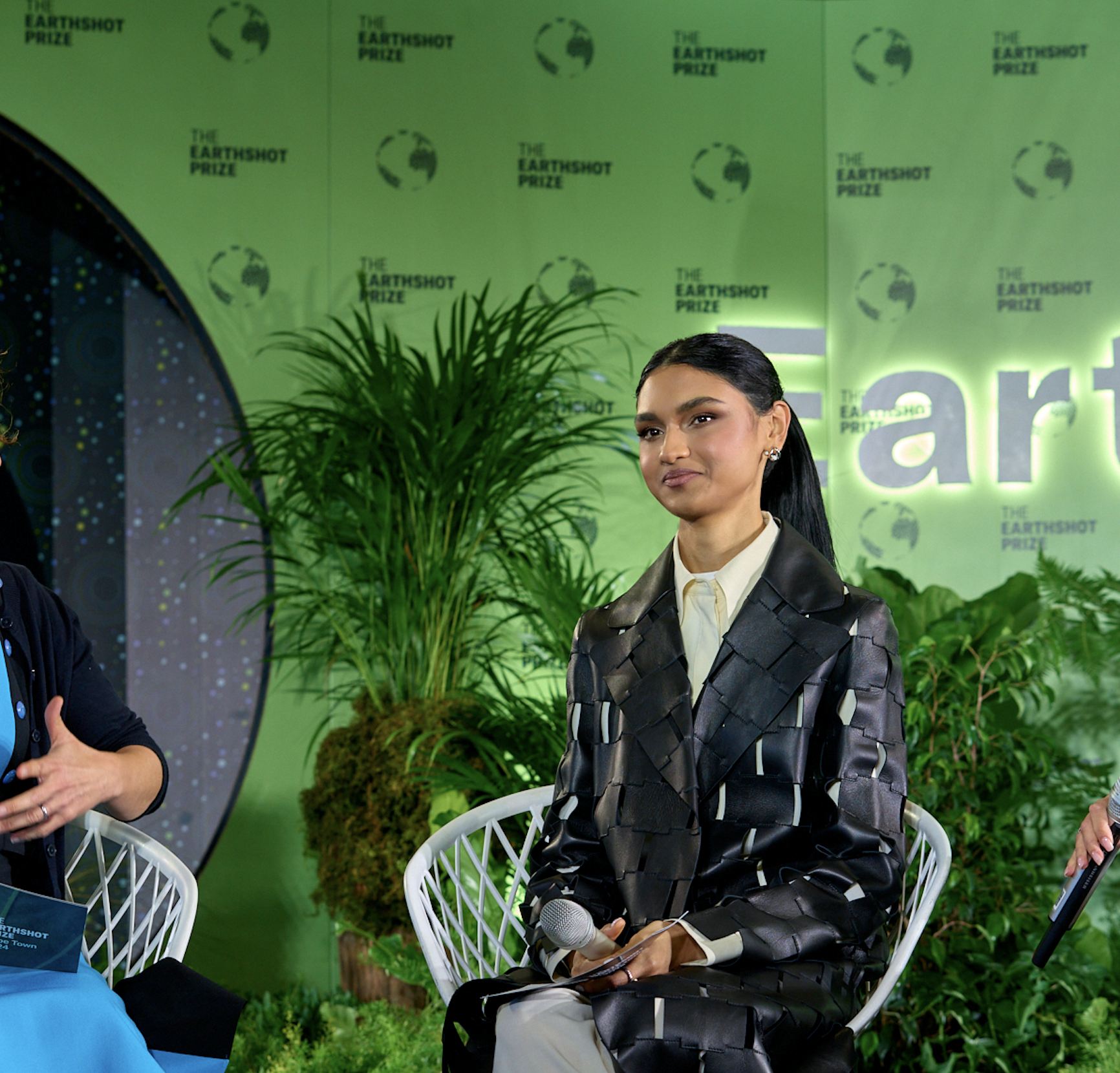

== Writing ==
Nirghin published her first book with Penguin Random House and has been invited to contribute articles to TIME Magazine in a piece titled "How AI Fluency Can Help Companies Succeed", Fast Company and The Economist.

== See also ==
- Maha Jouini
- Lorraine Twohill
- Carol E.Reiley
- The Earth Prize
