= Museum store =

Museum store may refer to:

- Museum shop, a shop at a museum
- Museum store, storage of a museum collection
- Museum Store Company
