= List of awards and honours received by the 14th Dalai Lama =

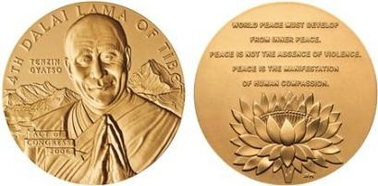
The Congressional Gold Medal awarded to the Dalai Lama in 2005

The 14th Dalai Lama has received numerous awards over his spiritual and political career. He was a laureate for community leadership in 1959 Ramon Magsaysay Awards, Asia's version of Nobel Prize. On 22 June 2006, he became the third person to be recognised with Honorary Citizenship by the Governor General of Canada. On 28 May 2005, he received the Christmas Humphreys Award from the Buddhist Society in the United Kingdom. Most notable was the Nobel Peace Prize, presented in Oslo on 10 December 1989.

== Notable awards and honors ==
Honor	Field	Place	Date	Ref
Grammy Award	Audio book, narration and storytelling recording for Meditations: The Reflections of His Holiness the Dalai Lama	Los Angeles, California	1-2-2026	
Gold Mercury International Award	Peace and Sustainability	Dharamsala	13-03-2025	
Pacem in Terris Peace and Freedom Award			04-03-2019	
Liberty Medal		Philadelphia	26-10-2015	
Honorary Membership	Neuroscience	Nu Rho Psi	03-02-2014	
Honorary Doctorate	Humane Letters	Macalester College	03-02-2014	
Honorary Doctorate	Humane Letters	University of Maryland, College Park	05-07-2013	
Templeton Prize	Religion-related	St Paul's Cathedral	14-05-2012	
Order of the Republic of Tuva			01-02-2012	
Honorary Doctorate	Humane Letters	University of Minnesota, Twin Cities	08-05-2011	
Honorary Doctorate	Oriental studies	University of Tartu	18-08-2011	
Honorary Doctorate		University of Arkansas	11-05-2011	
Honorary Doctorate	Doctor of Humane Letters	Southern Methodist University	09-05-2011	
Honorary Doctorate	Laws	Miami University	21-10-2010	
International Freedom Conductor Award		Cincinnati, Ohio	20-10-2010	
Lantos Human Rights Prize			06-10-2009	
Honorary Doctorate		University of Calgary	2009	
Hanno R. Ellenbogen Citizenship Award		Prague	2009	
Honorary citizenship		Memphis, Tennessee	23-09-2009	
Ján Langoš Human Rights award		Bratislava, Slovakia	09-09-2009	
Honorary citizenship		Paris	07-06-2009	
German Media Prize Berlin			10-02-2009	
Honorary citizenship		Italy in Venice	10-02-2009	
Honorary citizenship		Rome	09-02-2009	
Honorary Doctorate		Jagiellonian University	08-12-2008	
Honorary Degree		Lehigh University	13-07-2008	
Honorary citizenship		Wrocław	24-06-2008 (voted)	
Honorary Doctorate	Philosophy	London Metropolitan University	21-05-2008	
Honorary citizenship		Paris	21-04-2008 (voted) (same day as Hu Jia)	
Honorary Doctorate	Humane Letter	University of Washington	01-04-2008	
Inaugural Hofstra University Guru Nanak Interfaith Prize		Hofstra University, NYC	24-03-2008	
Ahimsa Award	For personifying the principle of Ahimsa	Institute of Jainology, London	08-10-2007	
Honorary Doctorate	chemistry and pharmacy	University of Münster	20-09-2007	
Honorary Doctorate		Southern Cross University	08-06-2007	
Presidential Distinguished Professorship		Emory University	05-02-2007	
Order of the White Lotus			10-12-2006	
Honorary Doctorate	Humane Letters	State University of New York at Buffalo	01-09-2006	
Honorary citizenship of Canada			28-06-2005	
Honorary citizenship	Ukraine	Mc Leod Ganj, Ukraine	09-12-2006 (anniversary of his Nobel Prize)	
United States Congressional Gold Medal			27-09-2006	
Key to New York City		Mayor Bloomberg	25-09-2005	
Honorary Doctorate	Humane Letters	Rutgers University	25-09-2005	
Hessian Peace Prize			27-07-2005	
Honorary Doctorate	Humane Letters	Nova Southeastern University	18-09-2004	
Honorary Doctorate	Philosophy	University of Tartu, Estonia	27-05-2005	
Honorary Doctorate	Doctor of Laws	University of Toronto	29-04-2004	
Honorary Doctorate	Doctor of Laws	Simon Fraser University	20-04-2004	
Honorary Doctorate	Doctor of Laws	University of British Columbia	19-04-2004	
Honorary Fellowship		Liverpool John Moores University	27-05-2004	
Jaime Brunet Prize for Human Rights			09-10-2003	
International League for Human Rights Award			19-09-2003	
Honorary Doctorate		University of San Francisco	05-09-2003	
Honorary Doctorate		Lusíada University of Porto, Portugal	26-11-2001	
Life Achievement Award		Hadassah Women's Zionist Organization	24-11-1999	
Honorary citizenship		Palermo (Italy)	17-05-1996	
Four Freedoms Award		Franklin and Eleanor Roosevelt Institute	04-06-1994	
World Security Annual Peace Award		Lawyers Alliance for World Security	27-04-1994	
Berkeley Medal		University of California, Berkeley,	20-04-1994	
Wallenberg Medal		University of Michigan	12-04-1994	
Honorary Doctorate	Doctor of Humane Letters	Berea College	1994	
Honorary Doctorate	Legum Doctor	University of St Andrews	1993	
Nobel Peace Prize	-		October 6, 1989	
Peace and Unity Awards	National Peace conference		23-08-1991	
Earth Prize	United Earth and U.N. Environmental Program		05-06-1991	
Advancing Human Liberty	Freedom House		17-04-1991	
Le Prix de la Memoire	Fondation Danielle Mitterrand		04-12-1989	
Raoul Wallenberg Human Rights Award (or Raoul Wallenberg Congressional Human Rights Award)	Congressional Human Rights Caucus		21-07-1989	
Key to Los Angeles		Mayor Bradley	September 1979	
Key to San Francisco		Mayor Feinstein	27-09-1979	
Honorary Doctorate	Doctor of Humane Letters	Tulane University	18-05-2013	

== Nobel Peace Prize ==
On 10 December 1989 the Dalai Lama was awarded the Nobel Peace Prize. The committee recognized his efforts in "the struggle of the liberation of Tibet and the efforts for a peaceful resolution instead of using violence." The chairman of the Nobel committee said that the award was "in part a tribute to the memory of Mahatma Gandhi." In his acceptance speech the Dalai Lama criticised China for using force against student protesters during the Tiananmen Square protests of 1989. He said the victims' efforts were not in vain. His speech focused on the importance of the continued use of non-violence and his desire to maintain a dialogue with China to try to resolve the situation.
