= Kriota Willberg =

American cartoonist and visual artist

- Born: 1963 (age 62–63)
- Areas: Cartoonist, Visual Artist, Massage Therapist, Educator, Choreographer
- Notable works: Draw Stronger: Self-Care For Cartoonists & Other Visual Artists
- Spouse: Robert Sikoryak

Kriota Willberg is an American cartoonist and visual artist who draws from experience as a massage therapist and educator in health sciences and the arts. She is the author of a comprehensive guide to injury prevention for cartoonists. Her comics have appeared in: SubCultures, Awesome Possum, 4PANEL, The Strumpet, Comics for Choice, The Graphic Canon; and the journals Intima and Broken Pencil. She is the first artist-in-residence at the New York Academy of Medicine Library.

Willberg has also worked as a choreographer for dance, film, and theater productions. Credits includes Difficult People (episode 27); The Bentfootes, directed by Willberg and Todd Alcott, starring James Urbaniak and Nina Hellman with music by Carmen Borgia; Grasshopper, directed by Todd Alcott; and On The Road With Judas, directed by J.J. Lask.

Her dance company Dura Mater was founded in 1993 and performed in various venues in New York (including Performance Space 122, Dance Theater Workshop, Dixon Place, Irving Plaza, and CBGB's) and around the U.S.

Willberg has also taught massage and pathology at the Swedish Institute College of Health Sciences, anatomy in the teacher training programs of Jivamukti Yoga Center, Dragonfly Yoga Studio, The Kane School of Core Integration, and other schools, as well as anatomy and injury prevention classes for yoga, dance, and Pilates in New York and nationally. She teaches anatomy at the Center for Cartoon Studies and in the dance department of Marymount Manhattan College, and has taught at Bard College, and NYU.

== Bibliography ==
- Draw Stronger: Self-Care For Cartoonists & Other Visual Artists. Uncivilized Books. 2018.

== Filmography ==
- The Bentfootes (2008)
