= The Ultimate Solution =

1973 novel by Eric Norden

- First edition
- Author: Eric Norden
- Cover artist: Seymour Chwast
- Language: English
- Genre: Science fiction
- Publisher: Warner Paperback Library
- Publication date: 1973
- Publication place: United States
- Media type: Print (paperback)
- ISBN: 978-0-446-75154-4
- OCLC: 1281098

The Ultimate Solution is a 1973 dystopian alternate history novel by journalist and former Playboy interviewer Eric Norden (pen name for Eric Pelletier). Set in a world where the Axis powers won World War II and partitioned the world between them, it follows a detective as he traverses the openly immoral society of a Nazi-controlled United States to investigate a sighting of a living Jewish person decades after their supposed extermination. The novel is noted for its particularly grim tone. Norden later wrote the 1977 Adolf Hitler-related science fiction novella The Primal Solution.

== Plot ==
In an alternate late 20th century, a New York City Police Department detective is tasked with finding a Jew who is reported to have suddenly appeared in New York City, decades after the Final Solution ended with the deaths of the last remaining Jews hiding in Cambodia in 1964, at the hands of the Einsatzgruppen.

This alternate world is incredibly barbaric and oppressive. Slavs and blacks are raised at "laboratories" and "farms" where their vocal cords are cut at birth as they are treated and classified as "domesticated animals"; black gladiators fight to the death at Madison Square Garden, while Slavic women are victimized in eroticized torture shows, and black children are lobotomized to be sold as leashed pets ("Her picaninny, one of the few I'd seen since the labs made them commercially available, pranced on its leash, gurgling excitedly in little drooling sputters. As she passed us, it stopped and sniffed at my trouser leg, and I could see the heat stitches of the lobo trepanning across the kinky curls, and the puckered white scar of the tracheotomy like a pale half-moon on the black throat. I tried to see if the thing was spayed but she'd dressed it up in silver lame pantaloons and a little brocaded vest."); children are encouraged by TV programs to torture and kill animals; body parts of murdered Jews are sold as souvenirs, with "collectors" aiming to collect samples from all extermination camps; Christianity (and presumably other religions as well) is suppressed in favor of Odinist temples; and pedophilia is legal, leading parents to sell their children to brothels. In an unusually tolerable twist however, homosexuality is legal and in fact considered a state ideal (in sharp contrast with the real-life Nazi homophobic policies), as is sadomasochism. Classic heterosexual sex among adults is somewhat frowned upon, up to the point that it could be hindering in one's carreer ("Myself, to be frank, I preferred adult women, although I had to be a bit discreet about it, being in the force and all that. Not that there's any active prejudice against hetties, the human race having to go on, but it's not exactly a ticket to promotion, particularly in the higher echelons of the State and Party. Back in the Academy I tried to get into the sadie scene to compensate, but I never really got too much out of it."). The Nazi regime controlling the United States is brutal and sadistic in its rule, but in an oddly American commercialistic manner; for instance, after massacring and razing a town for sheltering Jews, the Nazis converted the entire area into a gigantic shopping center. Police carry torture kits for "on-the-spot interrogations" and can extrajudicially execute anyone deemed an "enemy of the Reich". Former extermination camps are open as "national shrines", not to commemorate the victims, but to glorify their killers; the former camp in Croton-on-Hudson, for example, proudly boasts of being where four million Jews and "enemies of the Reich" were killed.

With "respectable" society being openly abhorrent, the protagonist finds vestiges of decency that exist solely in the underworld: old men still calmly playing chess at the tables in Washington Square Park; a former Roman Catholic priest who regretfully broke under Gestapo torture and dreams of a second chance to die as a martyr (the protagonist grants him his wish); and the "Patties" resistance movement (from George S. Patton, executed with Douglas MacArthur in the "St. Louis Trials") continuing to fight Nazi rule despite hopeless odds.

Eventually, the protagonist finds the hunted Jew himself, who is revealed to be from our world in which the Nazis were defeated and who somehow fell into this world. The protagonist finally kills him, not out of antisemitism (which he does not feel despite the nature of the world around him, having been born after the last Jews were killed), but in a sort of "kindness" since he would have undoubtedly been brutally tortured if he was apprehended.

All in the meantime, a Cold War escalates between the former Axis powers allies, Germany and Japan, both of whom have nuclear weapons and are engaged in a fierce arms race. In the Nazi government, tensions between the "Axists", a moderate pro-Tripartite Pact faction led by Albert Speer that aims for a continued uneasy peace, and the "Contraxists", a radical supremacist anti-Japanese faction led by Reinhard Heydrich that seeks an almost Posadist nuclear war, intensify while a senile Adolf Hitler is unable to lead as Führer. A putsch by the Contraxists ultimately leads to them gaining power, and World War III is effectively all but guaranteed by the end of the novel. The NYPD coordinates an evacuation to the Catskill Mountains, while the remaining resistance is completely killed off, as the world imminently faces its end.

== Reception ==
Norden's book, along with others exploring an alternate history where Germany won World War II, has been cited as a work that "fulfilled an important moral function by underscoring the barbarism of Nazism and clearly reinforcing the prevailing view that a Nazi-ruled world would have been an utterly horrific place."

Gavriel David Rosenfeld, in his book The World Hitler Never Made (2005), suggests that Norden might have been inspired to write his novel by a ten-day-long interview he conducted with Albert Speer, which was published in the June 1971 edition of Playboy. During the interview, Speer commented to Norden, "If the Nazis had won, [people] ... would be living in a nightmare". Rosenfeld sees Norden's novel as a morally informed critique of the 1970s "Hitler Wave" of renewed interest in Nazism which followed the publication of Speer's Inside the Third Reich.

The book is criticized as being too "farfetched", as many subjects in the book contradict real-life Nazism and some find it hard to believe that America could be occupied so easily. In the view of some critics, Norden – a radical opponent of the Vietnam War and other aspects of official US policies – might have meant to present to fellow Americans their reflection in "a very dark mirror" rather than portray a realistic alternate scenario of how World War II might have ended. In support of the latter view can be cited such features as that except for one German appearing briefly in the first chapter, all Nazis in the book are Americans, including the members of the SS and Gestapo, the concentration camp guards and commanders etc. Specifically, the commander of the extermination camp where the New York Jews were killed is presented as a kind of "All-American Boy", universally regarded as a hero, and who did it "not for hatred of Jews, but because it was a job which needed to be done". Further, these Nazis use typical colloquial American expressions while on their Nazi business; members of the New York City Police Department use the term "The Feds" when referring to the Gestapo; and they are proud of the Reich's space program and of having landed the first man on the Moon.

== See also ==
- Hypothetical Axis victory in World War II, which includes an extensive list of other alternate history works with similar premises
