= Carmen Borgia =

American singer-songwriter/theatre director

Carmen Borgia is a singer, songwriter, sound mixer and film sound designer residing in New York City. He was born February 3, 1959 in Jacksonville, Florida.

== Music ==
His music tends toward songs or soundtracks. Recent recordings are "North" and "The Red Circle Line", released by Arctos Records. In 2009 a theatrical musical, "South", was commissioned by Dixon Place in New York City.

Recent film scores include "The Bentfootes", directed by Kriota Willberg. Past music projects include the bands "Orson Welk", "Some Ambulants" and "The Secret Sons Of The Pope". He has composed music for numerous theatrical productions at The Western Stage in Salinas, California, including the 1989 production of "East of Eden".

== Writing ==
He is a contributing editor to The Digital Filmmaker Web site where he has written articles relating to the craft of film sound.

== Albums ==
- This Is Orson Welk (1986)
- North (2003)
- The Red Circle Line (2009)

== Directing (theatre) ==
In late 2024, he directed the Scott Carter penned "The Gospel According to Thomas Jefferson, Charles Dickens and Count Leo Tolstoy: Discord" at the Bridge Street Theatre in Catskill, NY. Carmen also designed the sets for this production. This play marked his debut as a director for theatre.
