= Joel Marks =

Joel Marks is an American writer and academic who is professor emeritus of Philosophy at the University of New Haven and a Bioethics Center Scholar at Yale University. Marks has edited two books on philosophical psychology and authored many articles and books on ethics, most recently Ethics without Morals.

He received a B.A. in psychology from Cornell University and an M.A. and Ph.D. in philosophy from the University of Connecticut in 1982.

In addition to his own speaking engagements, Marks has organized and chaired symposia, panels, and colloquia. For many years Marks also hosted an interview program on radio station WNHU in West Haven, Connecticut. Marks founded the Animal Ethics Study Group at Yale University's Interdisciplinary Center for Bioethics in 2008.

In 2010 Marks wrote about the threat of a planetary impact event in an article entitled 'Not With A Whimper, But With A Bang!' in Philosophy Now. His 2017 novel Traitors to their Kind is similarly themed.

Marks wrote an opinion piece for The New York Times in 2011 entitled "Confessions of an Ex-Moralist" about amoralism. In 2013 this was followed up by the book Ethics without Morals: In Defence of Amorality, a foundational text outlining his shift from a traditional moralist to an amoralist. Bad Faith: A Philosophical Memoir was published the same year and is an autobiographical account of his transition to amoralism. It was reviewed by Timothy Schroeder in Notre Dame Philosophical Reviews where he gave it mild praise. It was also reviewed by Bill Meacham in Philosophy Now who praised the work. His 2016 book Hard Atheism and the Ethics of Desire argues that atheism is only consistent if it also rejects objective morality.

In Yale colleague Wendell Wallach's 2015 book, entitled A Dangerous Master: How to Keep Technology from Slipping Beyond Our Control he credits Marks with impressing upon him the issue of planetary defense against impact events.

In 2025 Marks' book Ethical Health: Managing Our Moral Impulses treats "moralism" as an emotional problem akin to one needing psychotherapy.

== Bibliography ==
- (ed.) The Ways of Desire: New Essays in Philosophical Psychology on the Concept of Wanting Precedent. 1986.
- (ed. with Roger Ames and Robert C. Solomon) Emotions in Asian Thought: A Dialogue in Comparative Philosophy SUNY Press. 1995.
- Moral Moments: Very short essays on ethics University Press of America. 2000.
- Ought Implies Kant: A Reply to the Consequentialist Critique Lexington Books. 2009.
- Ethics without Morals: in defence of amorality Routledge. 2013.
- It's Just a Feeling: The Philosophy of Desirism CreateSpace Independent Publishing Platform. 2013.
- Bad Faith: a philosophical memoir CreateSpace Independent Publishing Platform. 2013.
- Hard Atheism and the Ethics of Desire: An Alternative to Morality Palgrave Macmillan. 2016.
- Maya: A Philosopher Considers the World As Illusion CreateSpace Independent Publishing Platform. 2016.
- Traitors to their Kind CreateSpace Independent Publishing Platform. 2017.
- Reason and Ethics: The Case Against Objective Value Routledge. 2020.
- The Spread and other essays on moralism and guilt KDP. 2023.
- Ethical Health: Managing Our Moral Impulses Routledge. 2025.
