= Wendell Wallach =

Bioethicist and author (born April 21, 1946)

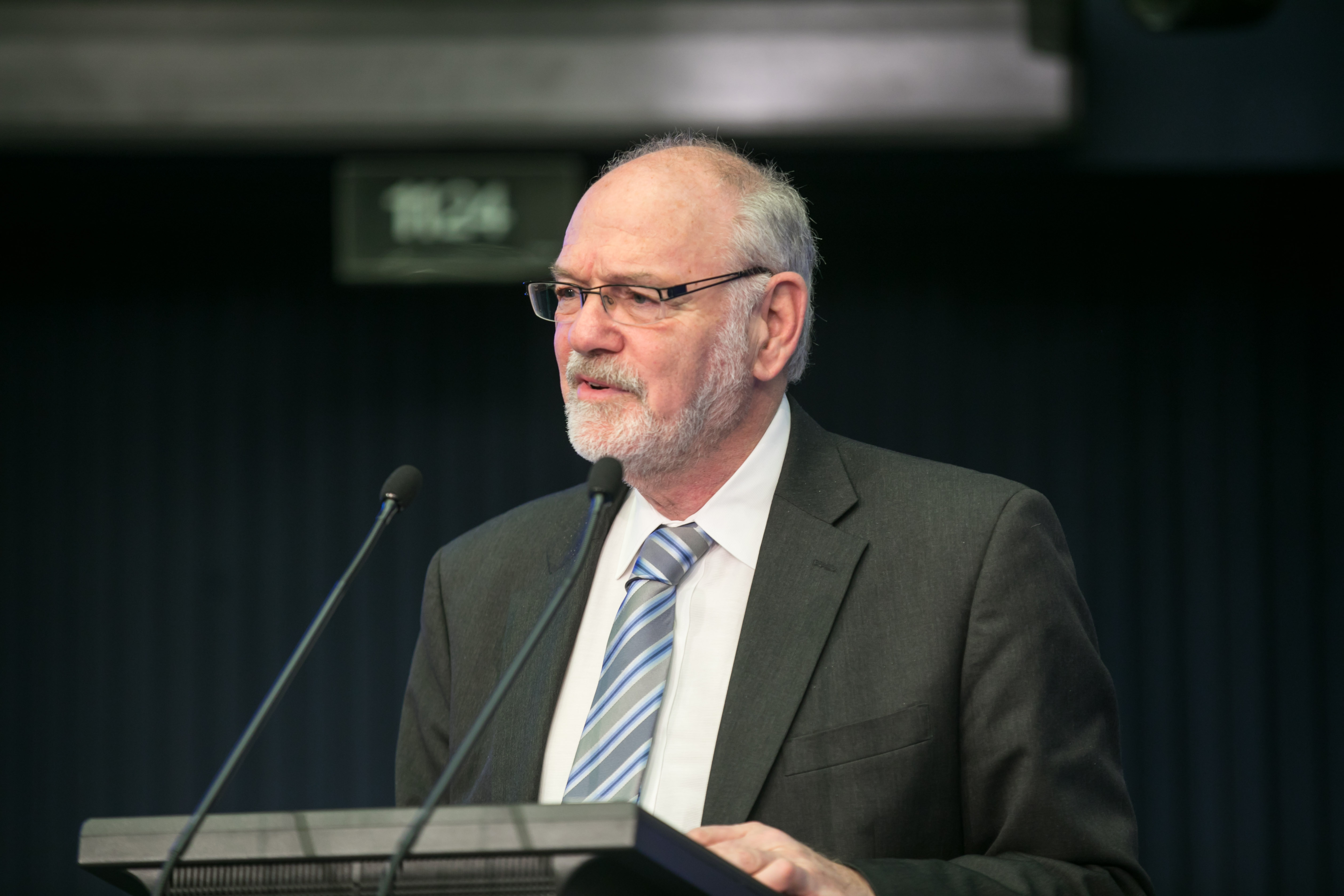
- AI for Good Global Summit 2017
- Born: April 21, 1946 (age 80); Torrington, Connecticut
- Education: Wesleyan University, Harvard University
- Employer(s): Emeritus Scholar at Yale University's Interdisciplinary Center for Bioethics, Emeritus Scholar at Carnegie Council for Ethics in International Affairs
- Known for: AI Ethics, Technology Ethics
- Spouse: Nancy Wallach
- Relatives: Amei Wallach (sister), H.G. Peter Wallach (brother)
- Website: http://wwallach.com

Wendell Wallach (born April 21, 1946) is a bioethicist and author focused on the ethics and governance of emerging technologies, in particular artificial intelligence and neuroscience. He was a scholar at Yale University's Interdisciplinary Center for Bioethics, a senior advisor to The Hastings Center, and a Carnegie/Uehiro Senior Fellow at the Carnegie Council for Ethics in International Affairs, where he co-directed the "Artificial Intelligence Equality Initiative" with Anja Kaspersen. Wallach was also a fellow at the Center for Law and Innovation at the Sandra Day O'Connor School of Law at Arizona State University. He has written two books on the ethics of emerging technologies: "Moral Machines: Teaching Robots Right from Wrong" (OUP 2010) and A Dangerous Master: How to Keep Technology from Slipping Beyond Our Control (BASIC Books, 2015), which was republished by Sentient Publications in 2024. Wallach discusses his professional, personal and spiritual journey, as well as some of the biggest conundrums facing humanity at the wake of the bio/digital revolution, in this podcast published by the Carnegie Council for Ethics in International Affairs (CCEIA). Wendell has been called "the Godfather of A.I. Ethics."

== Early life ==
Wallach was born in Torrington, Connecticut. He received his Bachelor of Arts from Wesleyan University in 1968. While a student at Wesleyan, Wallach traveled to Alabama to participate in the Selma/Montgomery March and spent a week on a hunger strike in Kilby State Prison after being arrested along with other demonstrators. In 1971 he received his master's degree in education from Harvard University, and also attended Harvard Divinity School. Afterwards, Wallach did a stint in India where he explored spirituality, meditation, and processes of cognition. In 1978 he published his first book, Silent Learning: The Undistracted Mind (Journey Publications, 1978).

== Career ==
=== Computer consulting ===
In the 1980s and 1990s, Wallach worked in computer consulting as founder and president of Farpoint Solutions LLC and Omnia Consulting Inc. These companies served clients such as the State of Connecticut, PepsiCo International, and United Aircraft. He turned over his interest in both companies to partners and employees in 2001.

=== Machine ethics ===
In 2004 and 2005, Wallach taught undergraduate seminars at Yale University about robot ethics, and in 2005 he became chair of the Technology and Ethics Study Group at Yale University ISPS Interdisciplinary Center for Bioethics. In 2009, Wallach published Moral Machines: Teaching Robots Right From Wrong (co-authored with Colin Allen, then at Indiana University), which discusses issues in AI ethics and machine morality. The abstract for the book describes it as the "first book to examine the challenge of building artificial moral agents." In 2015 Wallach became a senior advisor on synthetic biology to The Hastings Center, which is an "independent, nonpartisan, interdisciplinary research institute" focused on "social and ethical issues in health care, science, and technology." Wallach received the World Technology Network award for ethics in 2014. He also won the World Technology Network award for media and journalism in 2015, in recognition of his second book, A Dangerous Master: How to keep technology from slipping beyond our control, which discusses the ethics and governance of various emerging technologies. In this book, Wallach argues that "technological development is at risk of becoming a juggernaut beyond human control," and proposes "solutions for regaining control of our technological destiny." In it he also credits his Yale colleague Joel Marks with impressing upon him the issue of planetary defense against impact events.

In 2015, Wallach received a grant from the Future of Life Institute for a project titled "Control and Responsible Innovation in the Development of Autonomous Machines". The funded project was the first to bring together leaders in A.I. research, engineering ethics, philosophy, and machine ethics for three yearly workshops. In 2024, A Dangerous Master was republished by Sentient Publications with a new preface that covered advances since the publication of the first edition.

Wallach is the editor of the 8-volume Library of Essays on Ethics and Emerging Technologies, where he co-edited a volume on Robot Ethics and Machine Ethics with Peter Asaro, and a volume Emerging Technologies: Ethics, Law, and Governance with Gary Marchant. He received a Fulbright Scholarship as a Visiting Research Chair at the University of Ottawa for 2015–2016, and in 2018 he was named the Distinguished Austin J. Fagothey Visiting professor at Santa Clara University. Wallach was appointed by the World Economic Forum (WEF) to co-chair the Global Future Council on Technology, Values, and Policy for the 2016–2018 term. He also sat on the WEF AI council from 2018–2020, and was the lead organizer for the International Congress for the Governance of AI, which was scheduled to meet in Prague in 2020 but was forced to move online due to COVID-19. The online meetings were hosted by the Carnegie Council for Ethics in International Affairs (CCEIA) in 2021 and sought to create a Global Governance Network for AI (GGN-AI).

=== United Nations ===
In 2016, Wallach gave testimony at the United Nations (UN) Third Convention on Certain Conventional Weapons (CCW) Meeting of Experts on the issue of predictability in lethal autonomous weapons systems, The testimony argued that "while increasing autonomy, improving intelligence, and machine learning can boost the system's accuracy in performing certain tasks, they can also increase the unpredictability in how a system performs overall. Risk will rise relative to the power of the munitions the system can discharge." He later served as a member of the UN Global Pulse Expert Group on Governance and Data of AI in 2019, which called for responsible development of artificial intelligence and other emerging technologies to reach the UN's 2030 Sustainable Development Goals. In addition, he served as an advisor to the Secretary General's Higher-Level Panel on Digital Cooperation, and was cited in their 2019 report "The Age of Digital Interdependence."

=== Carnegie Council for Ethics and International Affairs ===
From 2020-2024, Wendell was a Carnegie-Uehiro Fellow at the Carnegie Council for Ethics and International Affairs, where he founded and co-directed the Artificial Intelligence & Equality Initiative with Anja Kaspersen. Wendell and Anja hosted a podcast as part of the AI & Equality Initiative, where guests included Angela Kane, former UN High Representative for Disarmament Affairs and Under-Secretary-General for Management in the United Nations, and consciousness philosopher and NYU professor David Chalmers. The Artificial Intelligence and Equality Initiative hosted workshops in 2023 at UNESCO in Paris and the ITU at the UN in Geneva that prepared recommendations for the international governance of A.I. From 2022-2026, Wallach has been developing theories of how human moral intelligence will need to be upgraded in order to successfully navigate challenges posed by climate change, A.I., other emerging technologies, loss of trust in institutions, and geopolitical instability. He named these theories "tradeoff ethics" and "a silent ethic."

== Personal life ==
Wendell is married to Nancy Wallach, and they live in Bloomfield, Connecticut. His hobbies include skiing, hiking, and building stained glass windows. Nancy is the assistant director of Research Ethics and Governance at New York University Abu Dhabi, and previously worked as the Director of Research Compliance at the University of Connecticut.

=== Family ===
Wallach's mother Gerda Wilhelmina Lewenz (April 7, 1915 – October 12, 2000) was born in Berlin, Germany in the middle of World War I. Both sides of Gerda's family were "prominent" Jewish bankers. Gerda was "deeply" involved in the German peace movement and was a peace activist the rest of her life. Gerda studied art history in Florence, Italy; in the U.S. she would own the Litchfield Gallery, and continued to curate art shows throughout her life. Back in Germany in 1936, she trained to become a nurse in Hamburg, where she met and married Dr. Gert M.K. (GMK) Wallach who was also a German Jew.

In 1938 and 1939, they separately fled to New York, settling in Torrington, CT and then moving to Goshen, CT. Gert opened a doctor's office in Torrington, CT, and served as Director of Health for Goshen, for which he received a Public Health Award. He later took a position as health officer and as clinician based in Chattanooga, Tennessee for the Georgia-Tennessee Health Authority serving Appalachia and was the Director of Health of Waterbury, Connecticut until his death. Gerda was featured in the documentary Letter Without Words (1998), a PBS film about her family's life in Germany from World War I (1914-1918) to flight from Nazi Germany in the 1930s.

Wendell has two siblings: Amei Wallach is an American filmmaker, art critic journalist, and author from New York, and H.G. Peter Wallach was an author and "political scientist specializing in American Constitutional law, and contemporary German politics", who died in 1995.

== In the media ==
=== Selected Videos ===
- In 2007, Wallach spoke at the Singularity Summit in San Francisco, CA, titled "The Road to Singularity: Comedic Complexity, Technological Thresholds, and Bioethical Broad jumps on the Route".
- In 2008, Wallach spoke at his alma mater Wesleyan University's WESeminar Series about his book Moral Machines.
- In 2009, Wallach spoke on a panel at Woodstock Film Festival titled "Redesigning Humanity" with Ray Kurzeil and Martine Rothblatt.
- In 2009, Wesleyan University Alumni Magazine did a profile on Wallach.
- Wallach was featured in the film titled Honda Dreams: Living With Robots, directed by Joe Berlinger, which debuted at the Sundance Film Festival in February 2010.
- In 2013, Wallach gave a TEDx UConn talk titled "Emerging Technology - Hype vs. Reality."
- In 2014, Wallach was featured in an article in The Atlantic, "The Military Wants to Teach Robots Right From Wrong"
- In 2015, Business Insider featured Wallach in an article titled "We've reached a tipping point where technology is now destroying more jobs than it creates, researcher warns."
- In 2016, Wallach reviewed John Markoff's book "Machines of Loving Grace" in The Washington Post. In the same article, Wallach briefly reviews "Our Robots, Ourselves" by David A. Mindell and "We, Robots" by Curtis White.
- In 2016, Wallach spoke at the World Science Festival on the question "Can technology lower healthcare costs?" with Eric Horvitz and Bertram Malle.
- In 2016, Wallach spoke about "Angels and Demons in AI" on The Open Mind, aired on CUNY TV.
- In 2016, Wallach spoke at a Carnegie Council For International Affairs event, titled "Global Ethics Forum: The Pros, Cons, and Ethical Dilemmas of Artificial Intelligence."
- In 2016, Wallach spoke on a WEF panel titled "Human vs Machine: The Significance of AlphaGo" with Lee Sedol.
- In 2016, Wallach spoke on a panel with Adam Thierer at the Mercatus Institute of George Mason University about the concept of "permissionless innovation" in emerging technology.
- In 2017, Wallach spoke on an AI ethics panel at NYU with Stuart Russell, Eliezer Yudkowsky, and Max Tegmark.
- In 2017, Wallach spoke on a panel at the Future of Life Institute's Beneficial AI conference about AI and ethics with Maggie Boden, Huw Price, and Francesca Rossi.
- In 2017, Wallach spoke at Davos on a WEF panel on driverless cars titled "Shifting gears to driverless" with Violeta Bulc, Carlos Ghosn and Paul Jacobs.
- In 2017, Wallach was a guest on The Wright Show with Robert Wright, where he discusses the dangers of artificial intelligence and biotechnology.
- In 2017, Wallach spoke at a WEF event "Artificial Intelligence Unleashed" with Vishal Sikka (then CEO of Infosys) and Ya-Qin Zhang (President of Baidu).
- In 2018, Wallach spoke on a panel with the Carnegie Council for Ethics in International Affairs about using AI to fight global poverty.
- In 2018, Wallach spoke on a panel titled "Control and Responsible Innovation of Artificial Intelligence" at a Carnegie Council for Ethics in International Affairs event.
- In 2018, Wallach was interviewed at the AI for Good Summit by the ITU.
- In 2018, Wallach spoke at a WEF event titled "Shaping the Future of Artificial Intelligence in China."
- In 2020, Wallach spoke with McKinsey's James Manyika about AI and the global south.
- In 2020, Wallach was a guest on PG Radio where he discussed the philosophy of AI, including questions on the nature of morality and consciousness.
- In 2025, Wallach was interviewed on MSNBC by Ayman Mohyeldin about the techno-industrial complex.
- In 2025, Wallach was a guest on George Bandarian's podcast where he discussed how big tech is shaping the future of AI.
- In 2026, Adam Ford hosted Wallach on the "Science, Technology & the Future" podcast, where they spoke about A.I. progress and how generative models struggle to make moral decisions.
- In 2026, Wallach spoke with George Bandarian about the upsides to A.I. and the uniqueness of human intelligence.
- In 2026, Wallach was hosted by the United Nations Archive & Library Geneva to discuss his book A Dangerous Master, the trajectory of A.I. progress, and how recent progress has failed to answer core questions on morality.

== Books ==
- Wallach, Wendell (2009). Moral machines: teaching robots right from wrong. Colin Allen. Oxford: Oxford University Press. ISBN 978-0-19-537404-9. OCLC 214322641.
- Wallach, Wendell (2015). A Dangerous Master: how to keep technology from slipping beyond our control. New York: Basic Books. ISBN 978-0-465-04053-7. OCLC 908671164.
- Wallach, Wendell (2016). The Library of Essays on the Ethics of Emerging Technologies: 8-Volume Set. Routledge.
- Wallach, Wendell (2016). Emerging Technologies: Ethics, Law and Governance (The Library of Essays on the Ethics of Emerging Technologies).
- Wallach, Wendell (2016). Machine Ethics and Robot Ethics (The Library of Essays on the Ethics of Emerging Technologies).
- Wallach, Wendell (2024). A Dangerous Master: how to keep technology from slipping beyond our control. Sentient Publications.
