= February 1959 =

Month of 1959

<<	February 1959					>>
Su	Mo	Tu	We	Th	Fr	Sa
1	2	3	4	5	6	7
8	9	10	11	12	13	14
15	16	17	18	19	20	21
22	23	24	25	26	27	28

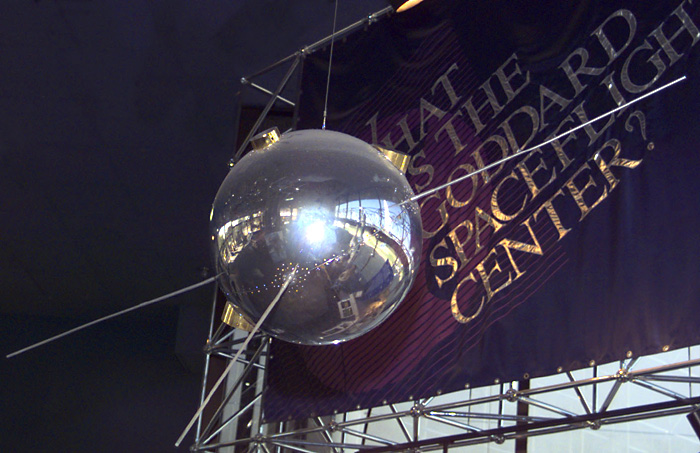
February 17, 1959: The first weather satellite, Vanguard 2, is launched by the U.S.

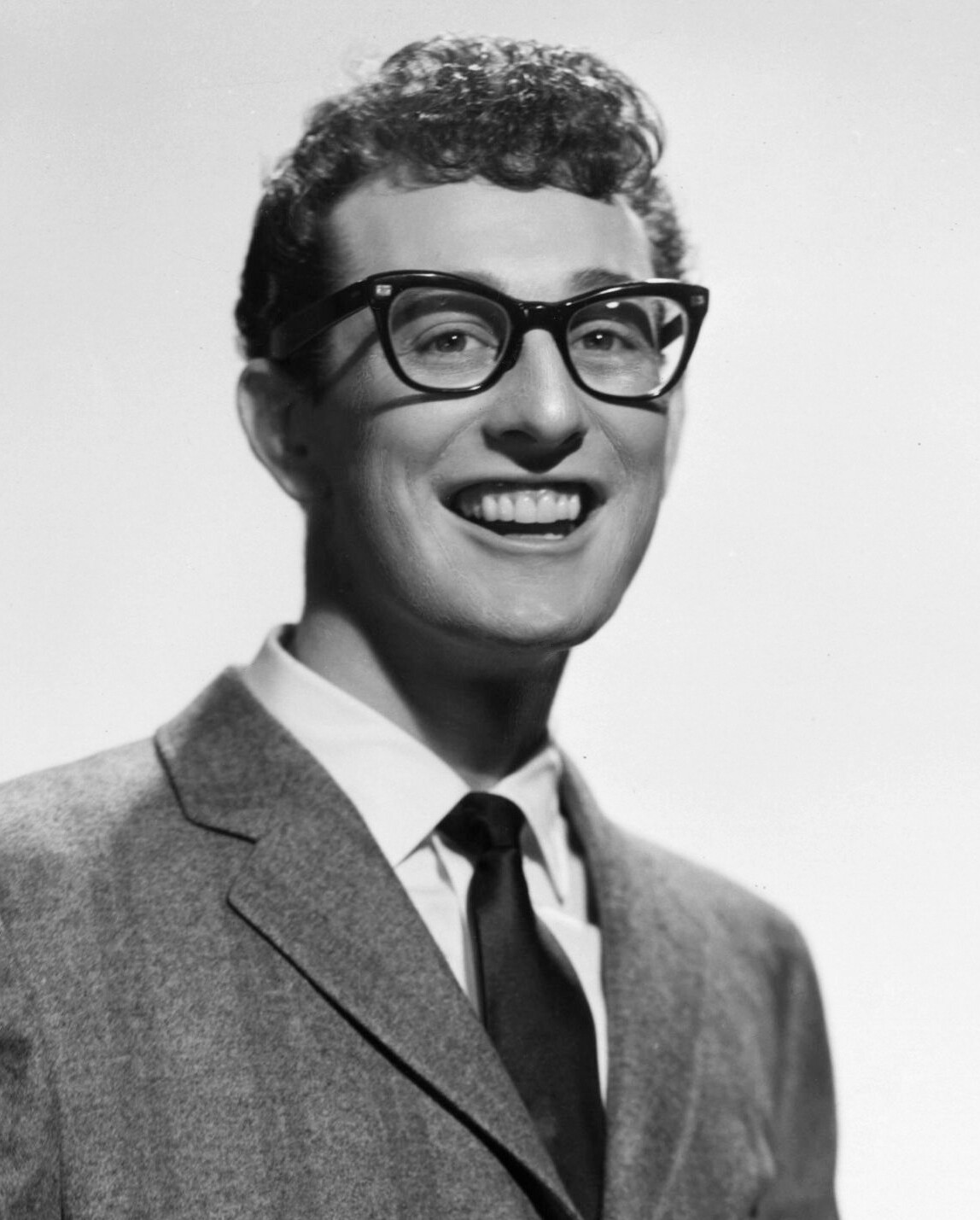
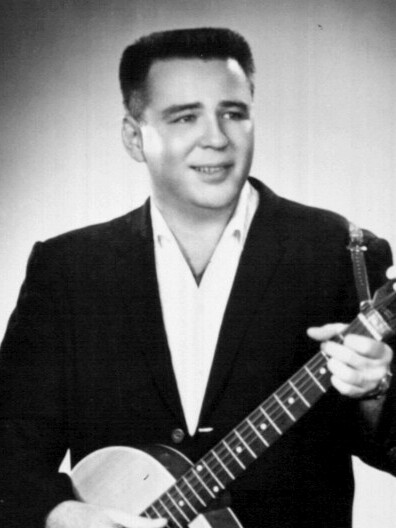
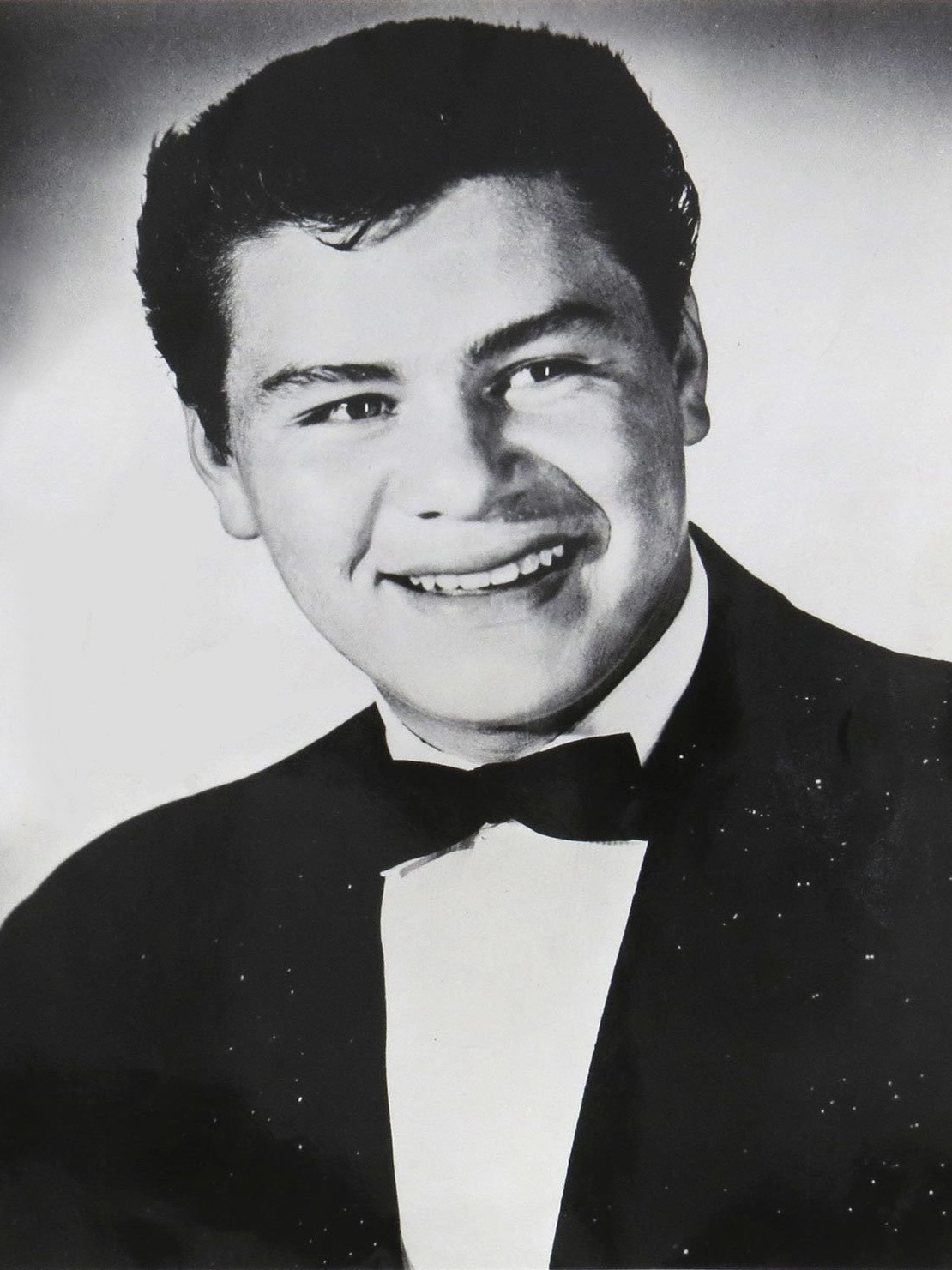
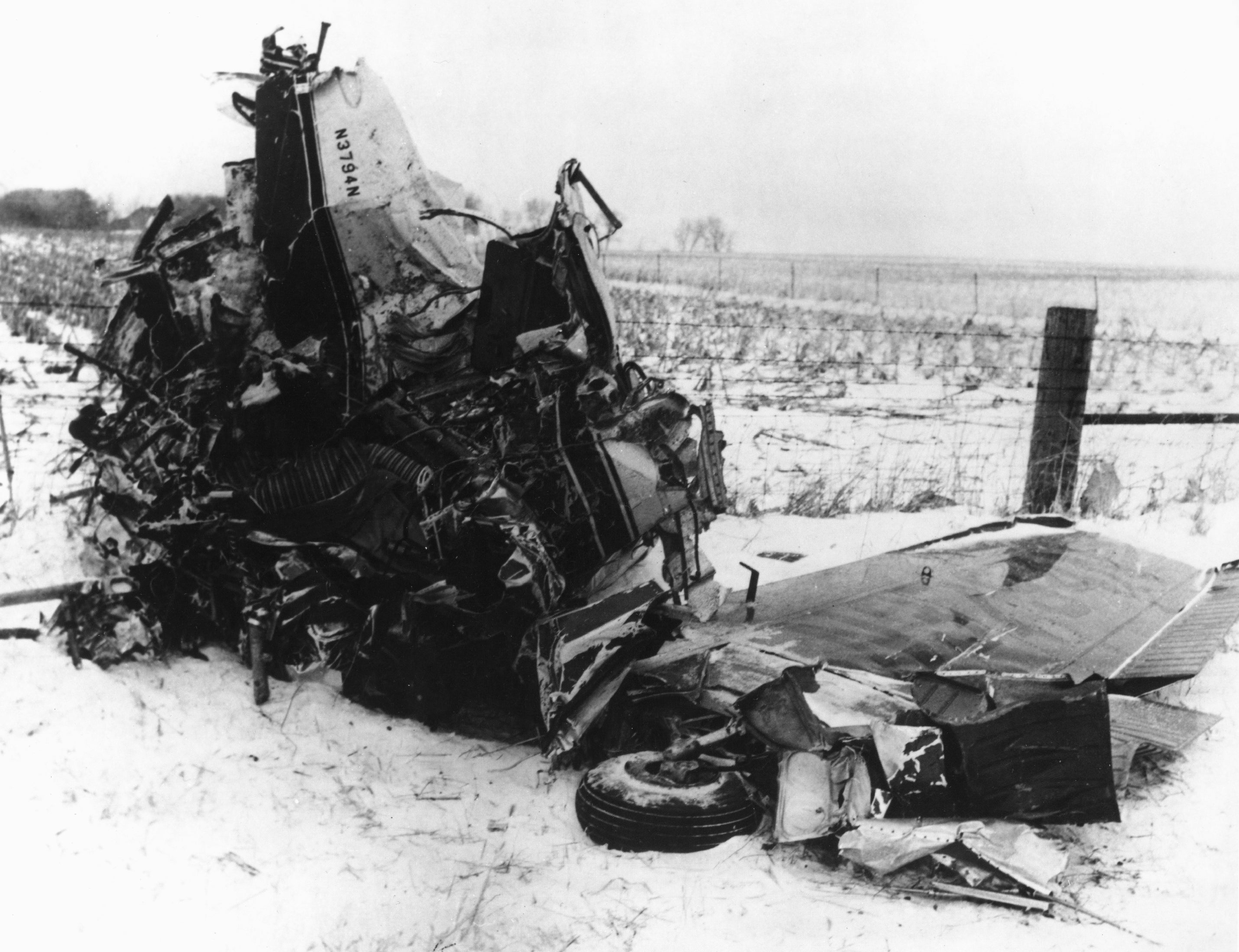
February 3, 1959, "The Day the Music Died": Buddy Holly (left), J.P. Richardson (middle), and Ritchie Valens (right) killed in plane crash (below)

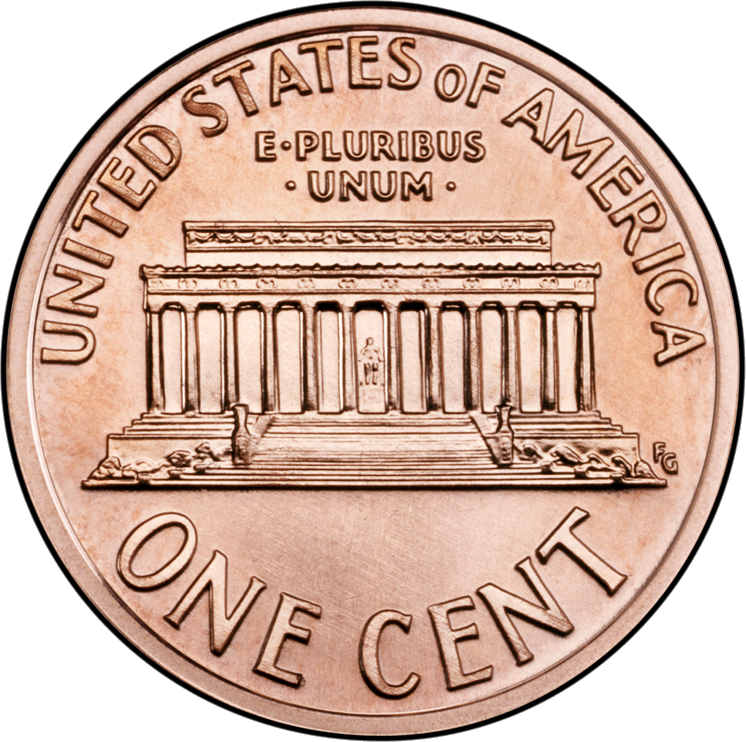
February 12, 1959: New penny released on Lincoln's 150th birthday

The following events occurred in February 1959:

== February 1, 1959 (Sunday) ==
- Male voters in Switzerland voted overwhelmingly against allowing women the right to vote, by a margin of 654,924 to 323,306. It was not until 1971 that Swiss women were granted full suffrage. On the same day, however, Vaud became the first of the cantons of Switzerland to allow voting in provincial elections. The Canton of Neuchâtel followed on September 27.
- Between February 1 and 14, some 508 records were reviewed for prospective Project Mercury pilot candidates of which about 110 appeared to qualify. The special committee on Life Sciences decided to divide these into two groups and 69 prospective pilot candidates were briefed and interviewed in Washington, D.C. Out of this number, 53 volunteered for the Mercury program, and 32 of the 53 were selected for further testing. The committee agreed there was no further need to brief other individuals, because of the high qualities exhibited in the existing pool of candidates. These 32 were scheduled for physical examination at the Lovelace Clinic, Albuquerque, New Mexico.
- Died: Frank Shannon, 84, American actor who played (Dr. Zarkov) in the Flash Gordon serials

== February 2, 1959 (Monday) ==
- The "Regiment of Spirit Soldiers" launched an uprising against the Chinese government at Sizhuang County, Henan, China.
- Nine hikers died mysteriously while on an expedition in the Ural Mountains of Russia in the Dyatlov Pass incident.
- Thirty-five test pilots from the United States Navy, Marine Corps and Air Force attended a briefing at the Pentagon in Arlington, Virginia, where NASA representatives invited them to become candidates for the first group of American astronauts.
- Schools in Norfolk and Arlington County, Virginia, integrated peacefully, as 21 African American students began classes at formerly all-white schools. At Stratford Middle School, with 1,076 white and 4 black pupils, in Arlington, there were fewer absences than usual despite threats of a boycott, and white students volunteered to escort the new students to class. In Norfolk, 7,000 of 10,000 students, including 17 African-Americans, returned to senior and junior highs after four months of attending private schools or being tutored.
- After arriving from Green Bay, Wisconsin, Buddy Holly, Ritchie Valens and J.P. Richardson gave their last performances, appearing at the Surf Ballroom at 460 North Shore Drive in Clear Lake, Iowa.
- Born: Jari Tervo, Finnish author; in Rovaniemi

== February 3, 1959 (Tuesday) ==
- American singers J.P. Richardson, 28, "The Big Bopper", Buddy Holly, 22, and Ritchie Valens, 17, were killed in the crash of a private plane on their way to Fargo, North Dakota. They had boarded the plane at Mason City, Iowa, along with pilot Roger Peterson. Waylon Jennings had given his seat to Richardson, and Valens and Holly's guitarist Tommy Allsup had flipped a coin to see who would get the other seat on the plane. The plane, a Beechcraft Bonanza, took off at 12:50 a.m. and crashed minutes later on the farm of Delbert Juhl, killing all four persons on board. This became popularly known as "The Day the Music Died".
- American Airlines Flight 320 from Chicago crashed into the East River while trying to land at La Guardia Airport, killing 65 of the 73 persons on board.
- Martin Luther King Jr., Coretta Scott King and Lawrence D. Reddick departed from Idlewild Airport New York for a tour of the Middle East and India.
- Died: Vincent Astor, 67, American philanthropist who inherited a fortune after the death of his father on the RMS Titanic in 1912, then donated most of it to various charities.

== February 4, 1959 (Wednesday) ==
- In Chelyabinsk in the Soviet Union, Latvian speed skater Nikolay Shtelbaums broke the world record for the 10,000 meter skate, set by Hjalmar Andersen in 1952. Shtelbaums completed the 10K skate in 16 minutes, 31.4 seconds, besting the Andersen's 1952 mark by 1.2 seconds.
- Born: Lawrence Taylor, American NFL linebacker for the New York Giants from 1981 to 1998, inductee to the Pro Football Hall of Fame; in Williamsburg, Virginia
- Died: Una O'Connor, 78, Irish actress

== February 5, 1959 (Thursday) ==
- The U.S. State Department released tapes that showed that Soviet jets had shot down an unarmed American C-130 transport plane on September 2, 1958. Transmissions between the two fighter planes, identified as "201" and "218", had been intercepted in Turkey. The Soviets denounced the tapes as a "clumsy fake". On the same day, Soviet Premier Nikita S. Khrushchev invited U.S. President Dwight D. Eisenhower to visit Moscow, adding that he could bring anyone, and go anywhere, he chose. In his speech, Khrushchev referred to the Secretary of State and said, "Mr. Dulles, if you so desire, then for the sake of ending the Cold War, we are even prepared to admit your victory in this war that is unwanted by the peoples. Regard yourselves, gentlemen, as victors in this war, but end it quickly."
- The title E-1 for U.S. Air Force personnel was revised from Basic Airman to Airman Basic.

== February 6, 1959 (Friday) ==
- Jack Kilby, working for Texas Instruments, filed for a patent for the first integrated circuit, which was granted as U.S. Patent 3,138,743 on June 23, 1964. Kilby had recorded his inspiration on July 24, 1958, writing "The following circuit elements could be made on single slice: resistors, capacitor, distributed capacitor, transistor" and put these on a silicon wafer.
- Following industry-wide competition, a formal contract for research and development of the Mercury spacecraft was negotiated with the McDonnell Aircraft Corporation. The contract called for design and construction of 12 Mercury spacecraft. Later, orders were placed with the company for eight additional spacecraft, two procedural trainers, an environmental trainer, and seven checkout trainers. McDonnell had been engaged in studying the development of a crewed spacecraft since the NACA presentation in mid-March 1958.
- Born: Ken Nelson, English record producer; in Liverpool

== February 7, 1959 (Saturday) ==
- Former SS Colonel Sepp Dietrich was released from prison in Munich after serving half of a sentence for assisting in the execution of high-ranking German officers in 1934.

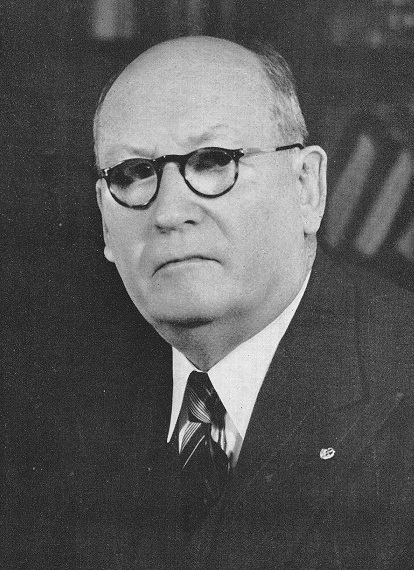
Malan

- After spending a record 64 days, 22 hours and 21 minutes aloft, two fliers landed their Cessna 172 in Las Vegas. Pilot John Cook and businessman Bob Timm had taken off on December 4, 1958, and on January 23, had broken the previous record of 50 days. They refueled twice each day at Blythe, California, from a truck that would drive 90 miles per hour (140 km/h) beneath the plane.
- At the Lovelace Clinic in Albuquerque, New Mexico, the medical tests for the Mercury astronaut selection began.
- Died: Daniel F. Malan, 84, Prime Minister of South Africa to 1948 to 1954 and architect of apartheid

== February 8, 1959 (Sunday) ==
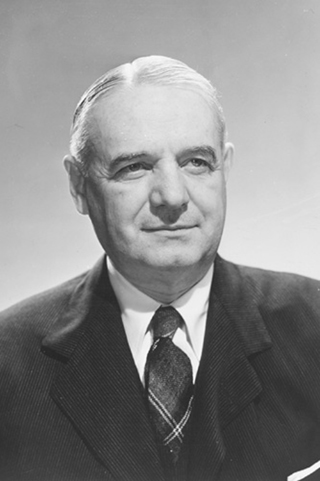
Donovan

- In the British Aden Protectorate, the United Kingdom created the six member Federation of Arab Emirates of the South, a political federation of the emirates of Beihan and Audhali; the sultanates of Dhala, Fadhli, and Yafi as-Sufla; and the sheikdom of al-Awalaq al-Ulya, a move that enraged Yemeni nationalists who claimed Aden as part of Yemen.
- Died: William J. Donovan, 76, Director of the United States Office of Strategic Services (OSS) during World War II, and one of the persons who helped organized the Central Intelligence Agency (CIA). President Dwight D. Eisenhower remarked, "What a man! We have lost the last hero!" A retired Army Major General, Donovan was the first person to be awarded the Medal of Honor, the Distinguished Service Cross and the Distinguished Service Medal.

== February 9, 1959 (Monday) ==
- The first ICBM, the R-7 Semyorka missile, became operational at Plesetsk in the Soviet Union. The missile, capable of hitting targets at a range of 12,000 kilometres (7,500 mi) was first tested on December 15, 1959.

== February 10, 1959 (Tuesday) ==
- At 2:20 a.m. CST, a tornado in St. Louis killed 21 people and injured hundreds. The twister flattened a neighborhood two blocks from Busch Stadium I.
- Wind tunnel tests of Project Mercury configuration models were started. By the end of the year, over 70 different models had been tested by facilities at the Air Force's Arnold Engineering Development Center and the NASA Langley, Ames, and Lewis Research Centers.

== February 11, 1959 (Wednesday) ==
- Meeting in Switzerland at Zürich, Prime Minister Konstantinos Karamanlis of Greece and Prime Minister Adnan Menderes of Turkey signed the first of two agreements concerning the upcoming independence from the United Kingdom of the island of Cyprus, which had large populations of Greek and Turkish Cypriots. The two nations, after consulting with the leaders of their respective ethnic communities on Cyprus, agreed to a constitution that would provide for both groups to be represented in the Cypriot government, and temporarily abandoned their conflicting demands. Greece refrained from pursuing enosis, the incorporation of the entire island as Grecian territory, and Turkey refrained from pursuing a partition of the island between the Turks in the north and the Greeks in the south. The two sides would sign a second agreement, the Treaty of Guarantee, with the United Kingdom in London on February 19.
- The Royal Air Force made its first public launch of one of its 60 Thor missiles, at a press conference at RAF Feltwell base. The intermediate range missiles had a range of 1,600 miles (2,600 km).
- Space Task Group and Army Ballistic Missile Agency (ABMA) personnel met at Huntsville, Alabama, to discuss Redstone and Jupiter flight phases of Project Mercury. During the course of the meeting the following points became firm: (1) Space Task Group was the overall manager and technical director of this phase of the program, (2) ABMA was responsible for the launch vehicle until spacecraft separation, (3) ABMA was responsible for the Redstone launch vehicle recovery (this phase of the program was later eliminated since benefits from recovering the launch vehicle would have been insignificant), (4) Space Task Group was responsible for the spacecraft flight after separation, (5) McDonnell was responsible for the adapters for the Mercury-Redstone configuration, and (6) ABMA would build adapters for the Mercury-Jupiter configuration.
- After five seasons of being officially known as the Cincinnati Redlegs, baseball's Cincinnati Reds reverted to their former name as evidenced by the release of their 1959 spring training media guide to the nation's sportswriters. The club's general manager, Gabe Paul, who said in 1953 that he had made the change to "Redlegs" because "we wanted to be certain we wouldn't be confused with the Russian Reds" insisted to reporters that "We haven't changed a thing. Reds... Redlegs... Red Stockings... they're all part of our name. We just decided to use Reds a little more." The UPI pointed out that "virtually every piece of publicity from the club spoke of the team as the 'Redlegs' since 1953."
- Died: Marshall Teague, 36, American race car driver, was killed in an accident at the Daytona Speedway, 11 days before the start of the first Daytona 500.

== February 12, 1959 (Thursday) ==
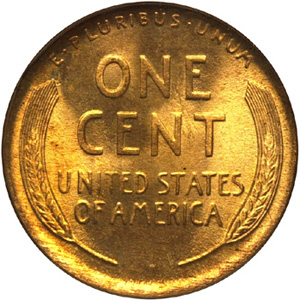
Reverse side of the phased-out "wheat" penny

- The new version of the Lincoln cent was introduced on Abraham Lincoln's 150th birthday. While the portrait of Lincoln was unchanged, the tails side had the Lincoln Memorial replacing the "wheat penny".
- The last B-36 bomber was decommissioned.

== February 13, 1959 (Friday) ==
- Fidel Castro took an official governmental role as he replaced Jose Miro Cardona as Prime Minister of Cuba.

== February 14, 1959 (Saturday) ==
- The United States Weather Bureau released a report that concluded "that the world is in the midst of a long-term warming trend", based on data gathered in Antarctica. Dr. Helmut Landsberg, director of the bureau's office of climatology, said that the cause of the global warming was unknown, but added, "One theory is that the change is man-made, that a blanket of carbon dioxide given off by the burning of coal and oil retards the radiation of heat by the earth."
- Born: Renée Fleming, American soprano; in Indiana, Pennsylvania
- Died: Warren "Baby" Dodds, 60, American jazz musician

== February 15, 1959 (Sunday) ==
- In Guatemala, President Miguel Ydigoras Fuentes acted to put down an Indian uprising that had been organized by his opponent Raul Estuardo Lorenzana. Ydigoras would later write in his 1963 autobiography My War with Communism that the rebellion was the first of several Communist Cuban plots against his government.
- Police in New York City concluded what was, at the time, the second-largest drug bust in American history, arresting 27 people between 8:30 Saturday night and 5:00 Sunday morning, and seizing 32 pounds (15 kg) of heroin with a "street value of $3,660,800". A January 1958 roundup in Elmont, New York, had netted 35 pounds (16 kg) and 17 arrests.
- The medical examinations at the Wright Air Development Center for the final selection of the Mercury astronauts began.
- Nine people in a single car were killed when their vehicle was hit head-on by another vehicle on United States Highway 281 south of Alamo, Texas. The driver of the other vehicle, whose speedometer was frozen at 80 miles per hour (130 km/h) after the collision, also died.
- Died: Owen Willans Richardson, 79, British physicist who received the 1928 Nobel Prize in Physics for his discoveries in thermionic emission and for his development of Richardson's law.

== February 16, 1959 (Monday) ==
- The French ocean liner SS Île de France was retired, sailing from Le Havre to Japan for use as scrap metal.
- Born: John McEnroe, American tennis player who won the U.S. Open championship four times (1979, 1980, 1981, 1984) and the Wimbledon championships three times (1981, 1983, 1984); at the U.S. Air Force base in Wiesbaden, West Germany

== February 17, 1959 (Tuesday) ==
- Vanguard 2, the first weather satellite, was launched at 10:55 a.m. from Cape Canaveral to measure cloud cover for the United States Navy.
- The first formal meeting of the Navy-NASA Committee on Project Mercury search and recovery operations was held. They decided that joint recovery exercises would be initiated as soon as possible. The committee members determined that the Navy, particularly the Atlantic Fleet, could support operations from Wallops Island; could perform search and recovery operations along the Atlantic Missile Range, using the selected Project Mercury vehicles; and that naval units could support operations in the escape area between Cape Canaveral and Bermuda.
- Adnan Menderes, the Prime Minister of Turkey, was among 20 people on board an airplane en route from Rome to London that crashed on its approach to Gatwick Airport. Menderes was scheduled to meet with Prime Ministers Macmillan of Britain and Karamanlis of Greece for an agreement concerning the island of Cyprus. Menderes survived the crash but was deposed the following year and executed on September 17, 1961.

== February 18, 1959 (Wednesday) ==
- Elections were held in Nepal for the first time in its history, as voters chose candidates for 18 of the 109 lower house seats, with the remainder to be chosen on eight other days.

== February 19, 1959 (Thursday) ==
- The National Assembly Building of Slovenia, designed by Vinko Glanz, was opened in Ljubljana, Yugoslavia, nearly five years after construction had started in 1954. A session of the Slovenian People's Assembly followed the ceremonies.
- In London, representatives of Greece, Turkey and the United Kingdom signed the Treaty of Guarantee, the second of two agreements regarding Cyprus, with all three nations being granted the right to intervene militarily, if necessary, to protect members of one ethnic community from the other, or to uphold the jointly-accepted constitution.
- In a speech, Dr. T. Keith Glennan estimated that Project Mercury would cost over $200 million. Glennan said the cost was high because a new area of technology was being explored with no precedents or experience from which to draw, and because the world-wide tracking network construction was a tremendous undertaking.
- Debbie Reynolds was granted a divorce from Eddie Fisher. "My husband became interested in another woman", she testified in a Los Angeles hearing. Reports added that she did so "never mentioning the name of Elizabeth Taylor".
- Died: Daniel A. Reed, 83, U.S. Congressman for New York since 1919, and former football coach at the University of Cincinnati (1899–1911)

== February 20, 1959 (Friday) ==
- At the Mkariba hydroelectric dam at Rhodesia, 17 men were killed when the platform they were on collapsed, sending them falling 200 feet (61 m) down a shaft.
- Canada cancelled the Avro Arrow program.
- Responsibility for planning and contracting for Project Mercury tracking facilities was formally assigned to the Langley Research Center.
- In testimony before the United States Senate Committee on Aeronautical and Space Sciences, NASA Deputy Administrator Hugh L. Dryden and DeMarquis D. Wyatt, Assistant to the Director of Space Flight Development, described the long-range objectives of the agency's space program: a multi-person orbiting space station; a permanent crewed orbiting laboratory; uncrewed lunar probes; and crewed lunar orbital, lunar-landing, and - ultimately - interplanetary flight.

== February 21, 1959 (Saturday) ==
- The Douglas DC-8 30 Series, a longer-range version of the DC-8 passenger jet, made its first flight.
- The New Yorker published "On the Sidewalk", John Updike's parody of On the Road.
- The Ben Hecht Show, a live television program on New York's WABC-TV, was cancelled permanently after Hecht's guest, surrealist painter Salvador Dalí, used the word "orgasm" in an interview. Ben Hecht, a screenwriter whom Mike Wallace described as "a trifle profane" on the air, had already been in trouble with the station. Wallace would later describe the episode as "the 'Orgasm and Out!' show".

== February 22, 1959 (Sunday) ==
- The very first Daytona 500, now NASCAR's preeminent stock car racing event, was held at Daytona Beach, Florida, with Johnny Beauchamp and Lee Petty crossing the finish line within fractions of a second of each other, and both faster than the existing NASCAR speed record. "NASCAR officials stationed at the finish line first gave Beauchamp the nod by 12 inches," one sportswriter would write the next day, but added "Petty insisted he had Beauchamp by two feet." Although the race took 3 hours and 41 minutes to complete, it would take three days for the race to be won, and only after NASCAR officials reviewed photographic evidence.

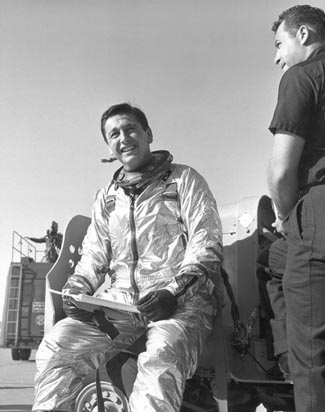
Crossfield

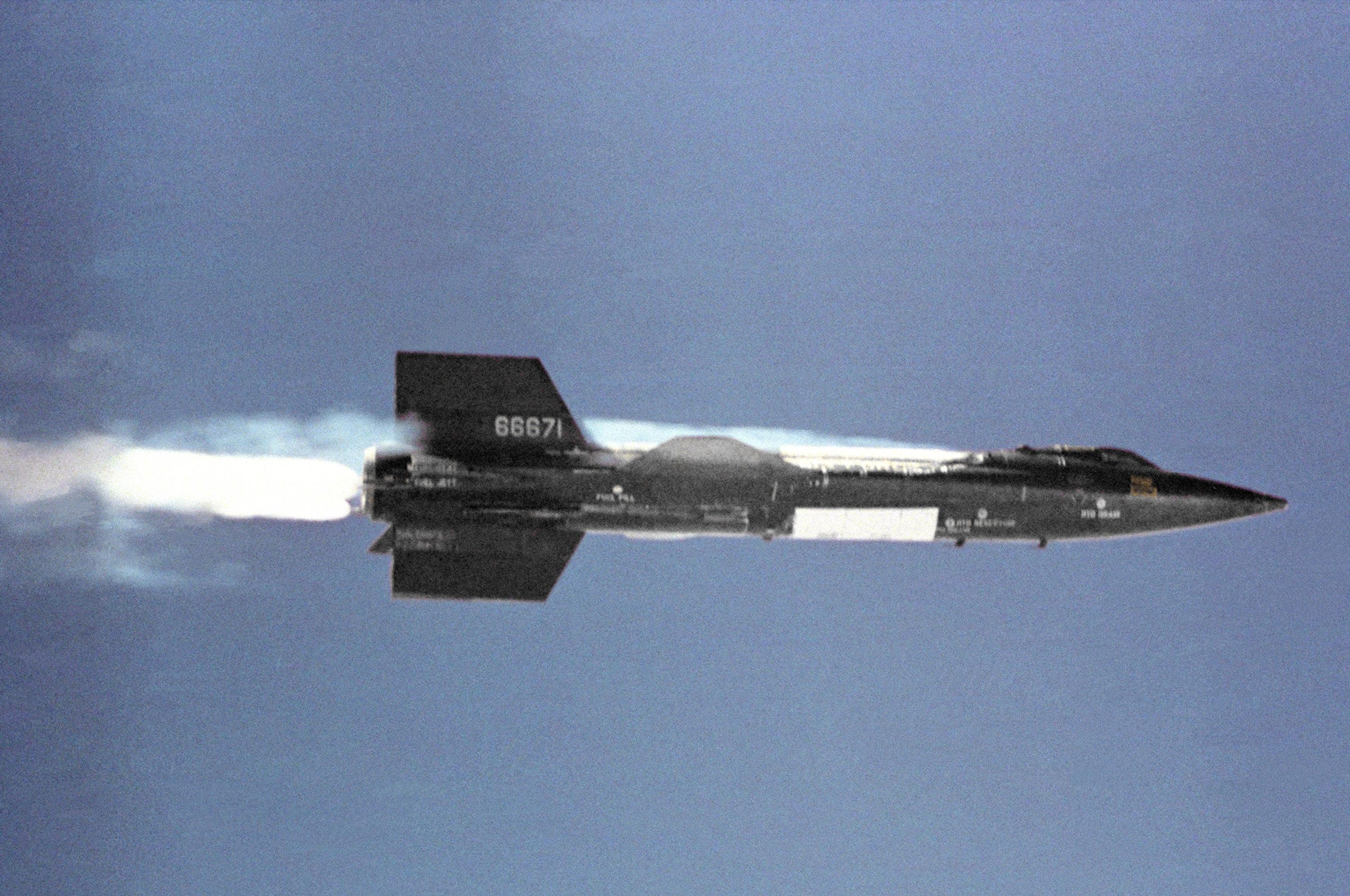
The X-15

- It was reported that the United States might put a man into space as early as February 26, 1959, with Scott Crossfield, a test pilot for North American Aviation, flying the X-15 to a point 200 miles (320 km) above the Earth, well above the 100 kilometres (62 mi) altitude that defines the beginning of "outer space". Under the plan, the X-15 was to be carried to 40,000 feet (12,000 m) above Utah's Wendover Air Force Base by a B-52 jet, then separate and ignite rocket fuel to climb into space. Crossfield was one of seven X-15 astronauts, as was Neil A. Armstrong. The X-15 would be tested by Crossfield in March, but would not be launched into space.
- Born: Kyle MacLachlan, American actor known for the TV show Twin Peaks; in Yakima, Washington

== February 23, 1959 (Monday) ==
- On his 91st birthday, W. E. B. Du Bois addressed a crowd of thousands at Peking University and was afterward given a party by Foreign Minister Chen Yi. The day before, the African-American author had been given an official state reception by China's Prime Minister Zhou Enlai.
- Died: Luis Palés Matos, 60, Puerto Rican poet

== February 24, 1959 (Tuesday) ==
- In San Luis, Mexico, seven children were killed, and 23 people injured, when a packed grandstand collapsed during a school festival.

== February 25, 1959 (Wednesday) ==
- Three days after the race had been held, Lee Petty was declared the official winner of the first Daytona 500 and the man initially ruled to have crossed the finish line first, Johnny Beauchamp, a close second. Bill France, the president of NASCAR, announced the decision at a press conference in Daytona Beach, Florida, and said that films and photos taken at the finish line had shown that Petty crossed the line ahead of Beauchamp.
- Norway and Israel signed an agreement in Oslo, providing Israel for the first time with deuterium oxide, also known as "heavy water", a key step in Israel's atomic program.
- Born: Mike Peters, Welsh musician, frontman of The Alarm, in Prestatyn, Wales (d. 2025)

== February 26, 1959 (Thursday) ==
- In Salisbury, Southern Rhodesia, Prime Minister Edgar Whitehead declared a state of emergency and ordered the arrest of more than 500 suspected members of the African National Congress.
- The Navy destroyer escort USS Roy O. Hale intercepted and boarded a Russian fishing trawler off Newfoundland, "to check whether it was responsible for damage five days earlier to five transatlantic cables". The Novorossisk, with a crew of 54, was released after a five-man team conducted an inspection.
- Born: Rolando Blackman, Panama-born American basketball player; in Panama City
- Died:
  - Princess Alexandra, Duchess of Fife, 67, eldest grandchild of King Edward VII of the United Kingdom
  - René Belbenoît, 59, who wrote the book Dry Guillotine after his escape from Devil's Island in 1935, died of cardiac arrest at his home in the United States.

== February 27, 1959 (Friday) ==
- The wreckage of the American B-24 bomber Lady Be Good was found nearly 16 years after the plane had crashed in the Libyan desert. The Lady Be Good and its crew of nine had become lost on April 4, 1943, while returning from a bombing raid during World War II, and then had to ditch in the desert sands. The men had died of thirst and exposure within a few days, and the bodies would be located a year later, on February 11, 1960. The discovery of the Lady Be Good would inspire Rod Serling to write "King Nine Will Not Return", the first episode of the second season of The Twilight Zone.
- In Boston, the Celtics beat the Lakers (at that time a Minneapolis team) 173 to 139 for the highest score by a team in a regulation NBA game; and, at the time, the highest ever for a losing team. NBA President Maurice Podoloff said that he would ask officials of both teams whether the players were faithfully defending, or just "goofing off". The record was tied on November 10, 1990, by Phoenix Suns (173–145 vs. Denver) for highest number of points in a regulation game. The record, set in overtime on December 13, 1983, is Detroit 186, Denver 184.
- In India, 126th Infantry Battalion, Territorial Army, J&K Rifles of the Indian Army was raised.

== February 28, 1959 (Saturday) ==
- At 1:49 PST, Discoverer 1 was launched from Vandenberg Air Force Base to serve as a "north–south polar satellite". The launch was actually the first of the Project CORONA reconnaissance satellites used by the CIA to spy on the Soviet Union. The first launch, and the next 11, were failures. A declassified CIA report concluded that "Today, most people believe the DISCOVERER I landed somewhere near the South Pole."
- Born: Jim Ronayne, Irish star of Gaelic football who played for the Dublin team for ten seasons; in Clontarf, Dublin
- Died: Maxwell Anderson, 70, American playwright known for What Price Glory?
