= The Primal Solution =

1977 novel by Eric Norden

The Primal Solution is a novella written by Eric Norden and published July 1977 in The Magazine of Fantasy and Science Fiction Vol. 53 No 1.

== Plot ==
An elderly Jewish scientist – a Holocaust survivor who had lost his entire family – discovers a means of "mental time travel", which enables him to project his mind into the past and take over the body of the young Adolf Hitler in Vienna in the early 1910s. Resolved to force Hitler into suicide, the vengeful professor can't resist humiliating him first and forcing him to drink sewer water in front of surprised passersby, before making him jump into the Danube – but in the moment before drowning, Hitler regains control of his body and returns home shaken.

The Professor is trapped inside Hitler's mind and is able to "hear" him think "The Jews? Why did the Jews do this to me? I have never harmed them!" Able to access Hitler's memories, the trapped Professor suddenly realizes that until this moment the young Hitler had not at all been an anti-Semite and was in fact on good terms with some Jews.

Only because something inexplicable had entered Hitler's mind – something which totally hated him and was implacably bent on his destruction, and which identified itself as being Jewish and acting on behalf of all Jews – did he become the genocidal Hitler known to history. Never daring to tell anybody of this presence in his mind, for fear of being considered insane, Hitler would gradually develop the idea that only by killing all Jews would he be free of that haunting presence. In short, the very act intended to avert the Holocaust ends up being its direct cause.
