= Museum Store Company =

Online retailer of reproductions of museum objects

- Company type: Private Company
- Industry: Retailing
- Founded: 1997 (Colorado)
- Headquarters: Denver, CO, United States
- Key people: Jon Fetzer, President
- Products: Museum replicas
- Website: http://www.museumstorecompany.com

Museum Store Company is an online retailer headquartered in Denver, Colorado, United States. It is an American company that sells reproductions of museum objects. The company was established as an online retailer in 1997.

== In popular culture ==
- In January 2008, Museum Store Company outfitted a room for the ABC television series Extreme Makeover Home Edition.
- In 2007, USA Today showcased the MuseumStoreCompany's items in their article "Decorating with Science".

This site's products were featured in the Universal movie, Catwoman, and were used as featured accents in the TV show Extreme Makeover Home Edition. The site also provided products to Lotte World in Seoul, Korea for their Egyptian exhibit.
