= The Earth Prize =

Environmental initiative award

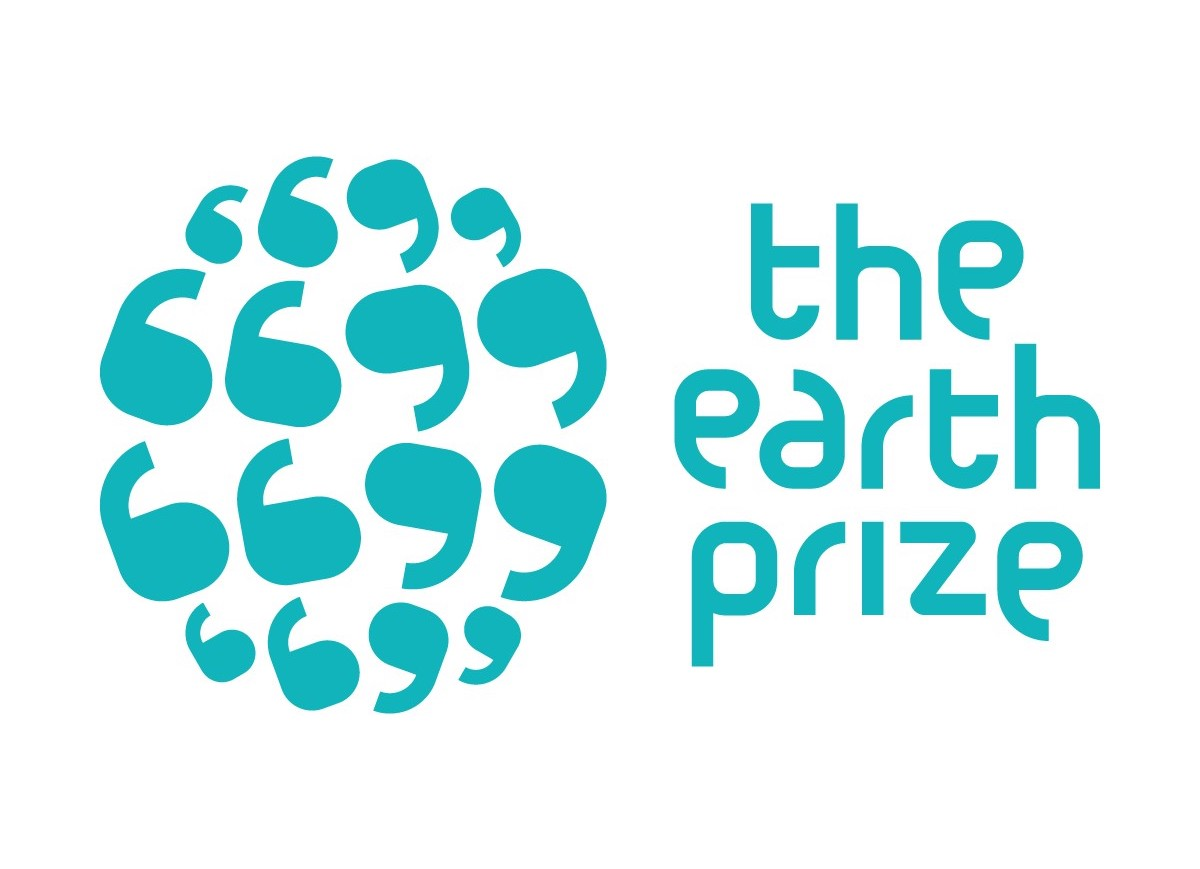
- Awarded for: Solutions to environmental issues
- Country: Switzerland
- Presented by: The Earth Foundation
- Reward: USD 104,500
- First award: 2022
- Website: theearthprize.org

The Earth Prize is the world's largest environmental sustainability competition for young people that awards students aged 13-19 with mentorship and over $100,000 in funding to develop creative and actionable solutions addressing environmental issues.

Born out of the global climate movement of 2019, it is the first and flagship initiative of The Earth Foundation, a non-profit organisation based in Geneva, Switzerland, founded by Peter McGarry. The competition was launched in September 2021, and first awarded in March 2022.

Since then, The Earth Prize has drawn entries from over 20,000 young people from 169 countries and territories. Having started with the 2025 edition, there are seven regional winners selected by a jury to represent Africa, Asia, Europe, North America, Central and South America, Europe, the Middle East, Oceania & Southeast Asia. Each regional winner receives $10,000 to implement their solution, before a public vote decides the global winner.

Each regional winner becomes the custodian of a Earth Prize flag: hand-embroidered from recycled sailboat cloth - which they look after for one year, before passing to the next winner.

Twelve mentors are also recognised as "The Earth Prize Mentor of the Month" and are awarded with a $500 prize each. Starting from The Earth Prize 2027, 35 scholar teams will each receive $500 each, and $6000 is being allocated toward a scholar continuation fund, to support teams moving forward with their projects. $5,000 is also allocated to The Green Accelerator for Educators, supporting teachers.

== 2026 award winners ==
In its 2026 cycle, The Earth Prize awarded 7 regional winners chosen by the adjudicating panel, with team Plas-Stick from Asia achieving the Global Winner title following a public vote.

The Earth Prize 2026 Awards
Global Winner: Team Plas-Stick, India (Jayshree Periwal International School) for their innovative powder made from waste tamarind seeds that clumps microplastics for easy removal from water with a handheld magnet.
North America Winner: Team SargaTex PR, Puerto Rico (Baldwin School of Puerto Rico) for a biodegradable fabric made from sargassum seaweed used for clothing and footwear
Africa Winner: Team HewaSafi Innovators, Kenya (M-Pesa Foundation Academy) for a low-cost vehicle exhaust system that captures emissions using filters made from maize, coconut, agricultural waste and algae.
Middle East Winner: Team Build Hope, Palestine, for turning rubble into reusable blocks, bringing young people together to rebuild their communities
Oceania & Southeast Asia Winner: Team Homes for Hornbills, Thailand (Choate Rosemary Hall) for protecting hornbills, vital seed dispersers in forests, through nests made from upcycled plastic bottles and community conservation.
Europe Winner: Team EcoPurge, Ireland (Loreto Letterkenny) for a biodegradable plastic that breaks down safely and releases catalysts to remove existing microplastics
Central & South America Winner: Team HADA, Brazil (Colégio Sinodal Prado) for biodegradable bandages made with aloe vera and chamomile that replace plastic with plant-based alternatives.
The Earth Prize Mentors of the Year: Florence Majala (Kenya), Omar Aloush (Egypt), and Aisha Putri Safrianty (Indonesia).

== 2025 award winners ==
In the 2025 edition, The Earth Prize awarded 7 regional winners chosen by the adjudicating panel, with team PURA from Europe achieving the Global Winner title following a public vote.

The Earth Prize 2025 Awards
Global Winner: Team PURA, Slovakia & Czechia (Gymnázium Jura Hronca & Gymnázium Hradec Králové) for A pioneering water purification solution that uses the power of light and plasma to remove harmful pollutants and combat antibiotic resistance.
North America Winner: Team StuyBigCompGroup, United States (Stuyvesant High School) for an origami-inspired and eco-friendly alternative to styrofoam packaging.
Africa Winner: Team Preserve Our Roots, Nigeria (Greensprings School Lekki) for a project turning underserved urban sites into green community hubs.
Middle East Winner: Team Sustainability Heroes, United Arab Emirates (Ghayathi Common School) for an AI-powered platform that integrates sustainability into school subjects.
Oceania & Southeast Asia Winner: Team Kultibado, Philippines (International School Manila) for an innovative web app that connects farmers, consumers, and cooperatives directly.
Asia Winner: Team Thermavault, India (The Shishukunj International School Indore) for a first-of-its-kind electricity-free refrigeration unit for medical supply transport in remote areas, using reusable salt-based reactions.
Central & South America Winner: Team EcoAction, Brazil (Instituto Federal do Tocantins - Campus Palmas) for a tech-driven solution using AI, satellites & data analysis to plan strategic greenery and cool overheated cities.
The Earth Prize Educators of the Year: Joseph Abbey Ogundlade (Greensprings School, Nigeria) and Soniya Jadhav (International School Hannover Region - ISHR).
The Earth Prize Mentors of the Year: Fransisca Majala (Kenya), Irine Odera (Kenya), and Chloe Luzar (Australia).

== 2024 award winners and finalists ==
The Earth Prize 2024 Awards
Winner: Team FloodGate (North Carolina School of Science and Mathematics, USA), for "a flood prediction and warning technology to protect communities worldwide".
Runner-up 1: Team CocoMellow (i-IVY, Vietnam), for "their design for eco-diapers made from coconut coir and banana fiber".
Runner-up 2: Team Ceres (Diyarbakır Bahçeşehir College Science and Technology High School, Türkiye), for "a system that leverages plasma technology to enhance seed germination and plant health, combating environmental stressors to increase crop yield sustainably and reduce reliance on chemical fertilizers".
Runner-up 3: Team Pebble (Eton College, United Kingdom), for "a system that hamesses idle GPUs to create a shared computing network, optimizing resource use, reducing carbon emissions, and democratizing access to high-powered computing while promoting environmental sustainability in the tech industry".
The Earth Prize Educator of the Year: Aashna Saraf, Founder and CEO of CreatED, an innovation hub in Mumbai, India.
The Earth Prize Mentor of the Year: Elham Ashrafizadeh (University of Toronto, Canada), Francisca Majala Mwaila (Kenyatta University, Kenya), and Yoong Sze Yeong (Nanyang Technological University, Singapore).

== 2023 Award Winners and Finalists ==
Team Delavo, a group of four teenage girls from Diyarbakır Bahçeşehir College Science and Technology High School in Turkey secured the top position as winners of the second edition of The Earth Prize on April 25th, 2023 for their "e-Caundry" invention, a filtration device that can be installed in washing machines to recycle approximately 8,200 liters of wastewater per year.

The Earth Prize 2023 Awards
Winner: Team Delavo (Diyarbakır Bahçeşehir College Science and Technology High School, Turkey), for their washing machine filtration device that allows for the recycling of laundry wastewater.
Runner-up 1: Runner-up 1: Team AgriVision (Polytechnic School, USA), for a hyperspectral imagery system to measure agricultural plant health during early, treatable stages.
Runner-up 2: Team AgriPod (Leicester Grammar School, United Kingdom), for a high-tech advisory system that can reduce fertilizer waste in farming.
Runner-up 3: Team Bactoplastics (Winchester College, United Kingdom), for a new cost-effective method of producing PHA plastic to substitute petroleum-based plastics for packaging.
The Earth Prize Educator of the Year: Kathy Dada from Collège des Sœurs des Saints Cœurs Ain Najm in Lebanon.
The Earth Prize Mentor of the Year: Pierfrancesco Merico (St. Gallen University, Switzerland), Stephen Okoth (Oberlin College, USA) and Chloe Luzar (Macquarie University, Australia).

== 2022 Award Winners and Finalists ==
In the 2022 edition of The Earth Prize, ten teams of teenage students from Armenia, Great Britain, Vietnam, Switzerland, Taiwan, Canada, the United Arab Emirates, South Korea, Jamaica, and Kenya advanced to the final phase of the competition, including students from Eton College (Great Britain).

The Earth Prize 2022 Awards Ceremony took place virtually on March 25, 2022. Team Adorbsies, a team of three teenage girls from Vietnam who proposed the idea for a biodegradable sanitary pad made out of dragon fruit waste, was announced as the first-ever winner of the competition.

The Earth Prize 2022 Awards
Winner: Team Adorbsies (Summit Education, Vietnam), for a biodegradable sanitary pad made out of dragon fruit peels.
Runner-up 1: Team Big GEMS (GEMS Academy, Taiwan), for a filtering kit that uses enzymes to degrade dye wastewater produced by the textile industry.
Runner-up 2: Team CIECO (Chadwick International School, South Korea), for a reusable cup circulation system that replaced plastic cups at their school.
Runner-up 3: Team Viridis (Campion College, Jamaica), for a mobile app that helps fight food waste from supermarkets.
The Earth Prize Educator of the Year: Safa’ Obeid from Sweileh Preparatory Coeducational School (UNRWA) in Amman, Jordan.
The Earth Prize Mentor of the Year: Annamaria Szelics, student at the University of Glasgow.
