= Anja Kaspersen =

Norwegian diplomat and academic

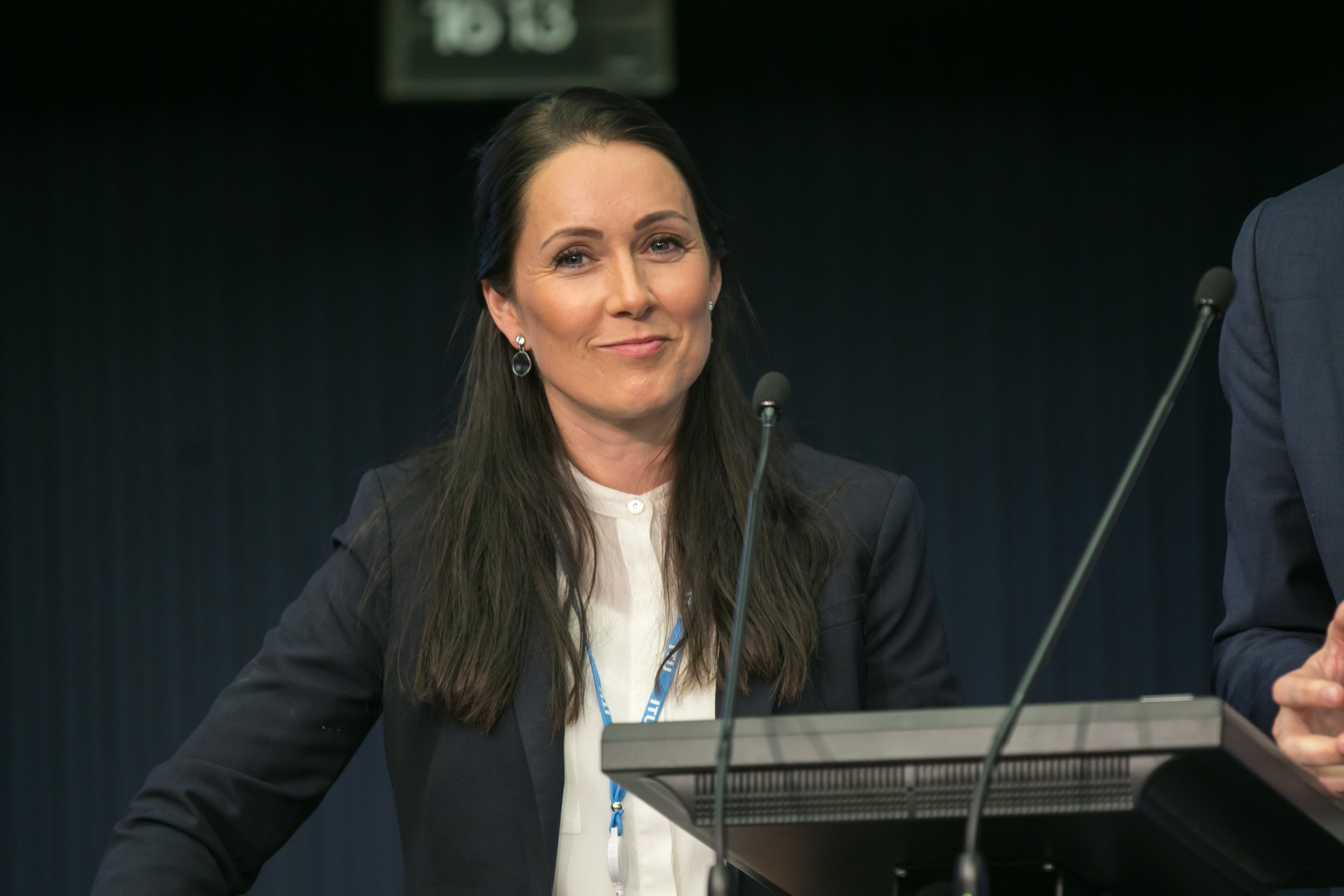
- Anja Kaspersen, AI for GOOD Global Summit 2017
- Education: IMD Business School, London School of Economics, Harvard, Berkeley, University of Oslo, University of Trondheim, Stanford
- Employer(s): Senior Fellow at Carnegie Council for Ethics in International Affairs, former Director at United Nations Office for Disarmament Affairs Norwegian Ministry of Foreign Affairs, EU United Nations NUPI Interpol IEEE Norwegian Ministry of Defence World Economic Forum International Committee of the Red Cross

Anja Kaspersen is a director for Global Markets Development, Frontier and Critical Technologies at IEEE, a global charity and the world's largest technical professional organisation. Kaspersen is a former co-director and senior fellow at Carnegie Council for Ethics in International Affairs where she launched the Artificial Intelligence Equality Initiative with Wendell Wallach. With scholars and thinkers in the field of technology governance, supported by Carnegie Council for Ethics in International Affairs and IEEE, Kaspersen and Wallach, provided a Proposal for International governance of AI with modalities for implementation. Kaspersen serves (in her personal capacity) as a member of the Interpol's Standing Committee on Ethical Matters Values and ethics, and in 2025 she was appointed as a member of the United Nations Multi-Stakeholder Working Group on Data Governance at All Levels Wayback Machine. She is an Executive in Residence at the NYU Stern School of Business. Events|Executive-in-Residence Panel featuring Ali Heron, Anja Kaspersen, Jordan Hoffner - NYU Stern and a Special Advisor on Digital Technologies, Equity, Peace and Democracy at the Kofi Annan Foundation. She is also affiliated with SWIFT Partners focusing on harnessing foresight to navigate knowns and unknowns in the field of AI.

Kaspersen is the former director of the United Nations Office for Disarmament Affairs in Geneva and Deputy Secretary General of the Conference on Disarmament (UNODA). Previously, she held the role as the head of strategic engagement and new technologies at the International Committee of the Red Cross (ICRC). Prior to joining the ICRC she served as a senior director for geopolitics and international security and a member of the executive committee at the World Economic Forum.

Kaspersen has worked in business, diplomacy, and academia. She is an author, podcast host, public speaker, and commentator on topics including geopolitics, national security peacekeeping, arms control, multilateral diplomacy, emerging technology ethics, artificial intelligence, cyber conflict, digital resilience and oceans security. Her work has focused on interdisciplinary approaches to international security, technology governance, arms control, responsible innovation, and multilateral cooperation.

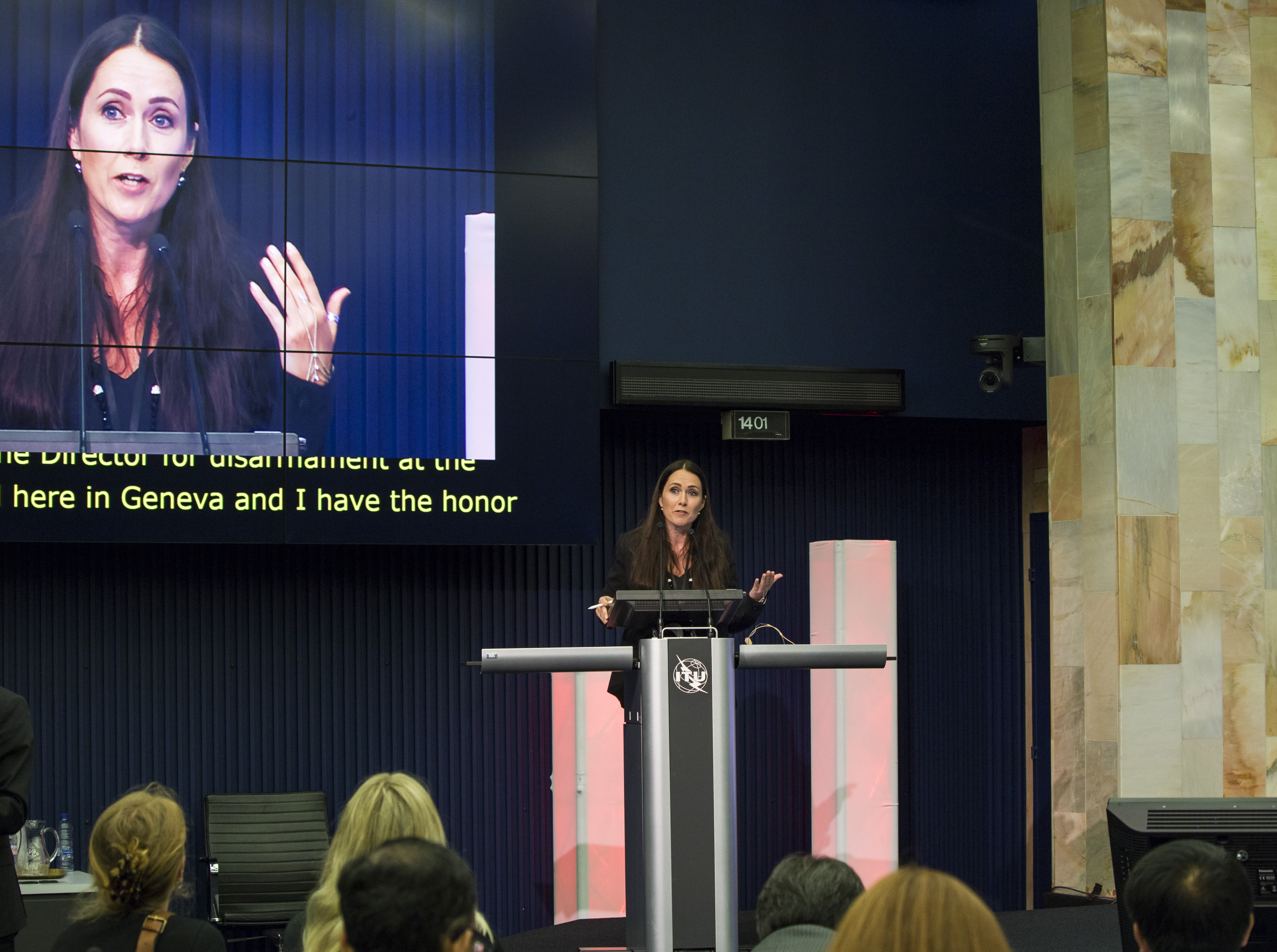
AI for Good Global Summit 2018 (42082657332)

Kaspersen is an alumni International Gender Champion, a member of the International Telecommunication Union, AI for Good Global Summit's Programme Committee, a member of the IEEE Council on Extended Intelligence and Industry Activities on Ethics in Action in Autonomous and Intelligence Systems, Well-Being Initiative, Life Science Innovation and AI, member of the Council of the International Military Council on Climate and Security, and the advisory board of ThinkTech.

Kaspersen has been recognized for her work in intelligence ethics, technology policy, and inter disciplinary approaches to governance. In 2024, she was included in Abelia's list of Norway's Top 50 Tech Women Norges 50 fremste tech-kvinner 2024 Alle kårede tech-kvinner|Abelia. In 2019 and 2020, she was included in the '100 Brilliant Women in AI Ethics list. As a Norwegian diplomat, Kaspersen was involved in work related to multidimensional and integrated peace operations. Norway was granted ASEAN Sectorial Dialogue Partner status in 2015.

As a Norwegian diplomat, she has worked on international security, integrated peace operations and regional affairs.

During her tenure in the Norwegian foreign service, she contributed to strengthening Norway's engagement with regional and multilateral institutions, including the ASEAN. Norway was accepted as a Sectoral Dialogue Partner at the 48th ASEAN Foreign Ministers' Meeting in Kuala Lumpur in August 2015, becoming the first European state to enter into such a formalized partnership.

The partnership has since been developed through agreed practical cooperation areas, successive action plans and regular political dialogue.

Her work on peace operations, rule of law, law enforcement and civilian crisis management has been reflected in Norwegian policy papers addressing the evolution of multidimensional peacekeeping within the United Nations. These analyses have examined integrated mission design, political coordination and civilian components, as well as operational requirements for effective law enforcement support and strengthening of legal frameworks in post-conflict environments.

In addition to pioneering and supporting international and multilateral efforts to establish global governance and interdisciplinary dialogue on the impact of new technologies and artificial intelligence on stability, society, resilience, non proliferation, Arms control, global standards and international safeguards, Kaspersen has been a advocate for drawing lessons from historical models of cooperative governance around sensitive technologies. She has highlighted the role of institutions such as CERN and the multilateral frameworks developed in civil aviation and within the IAEA as examples of how international regimes have balanced technological progress, shared research and global safety norms. Her engagement with these governance traditions, combined with her background in technology, engineering and science, has enabled her to support initiatives aimed at deepening public and private sector understanding and cooperation, particularly in promoting the beneficial and responsible use of artificial intelligence. UN Leaders Roundtable Lunch – How to leverage AI in the UN in support of safe, responsible and equitable AI?. She was selected in 2020 as one of the top innovators by the World Summit AI and Inspired Minds for her work among top 50 Innovators.

== Education and career ==
Kaspersen attended The London School of Economics and Political Science (LSE) and got her Master of Science degree. In 2017 she entered the Executive Programme at IMD Business School.

== Publications ==
- Anja Kaspersen, Wendell Wallach, "A Framework for the International Governance of AI", Carnegie Council for Ethics in International Affairs, Artificial Intelligence & Equality Initiative (AIEI).
- Anja Kaspersen, Wendell Wallach, "Now is the Moment for a Systemic Reset of AI and Technology Governance", AI Governance Framework, Carnegie Council for Ethics in International Affairs, Artificial Intelligence & Equality Initiative (AIEI).
- Anja Kaspesen, "Ethics and Fairness in AI: Who Makes the Rules", Carnegie Council for Ethics in International Affairs, Artificial Intelligence & Equality Initiative (AIEI).
- Anja Kaspersen, Wendell Wallach, "We’re failing at the ethics of AI. Here's how we make real impact". World Economic Forum.
- Anja Kaspersen, Kobi Leins, "Seven Myths of Using the Term “Human on the Loop”: “Just What Do You Think You Are Doing, Dave?” Carnegie Council for Ethics in International Affairs, Artificial Intelligence & Equality Initiative (AIEI).
- Anja Kaspersen, "Transition Management", «Challenges to Collective Security» Working Papers from NUPI's UN Programme.
- Anja Kaspersen and Ole Jacob Sending, "The United Nations and Civilian Crisis Management", Working Papers from NUPI's UN Programme.
