= H.810 =

ITU-T Recommendation on connected health devices

- E-health multimedia systems, services and applications – Personal health systems
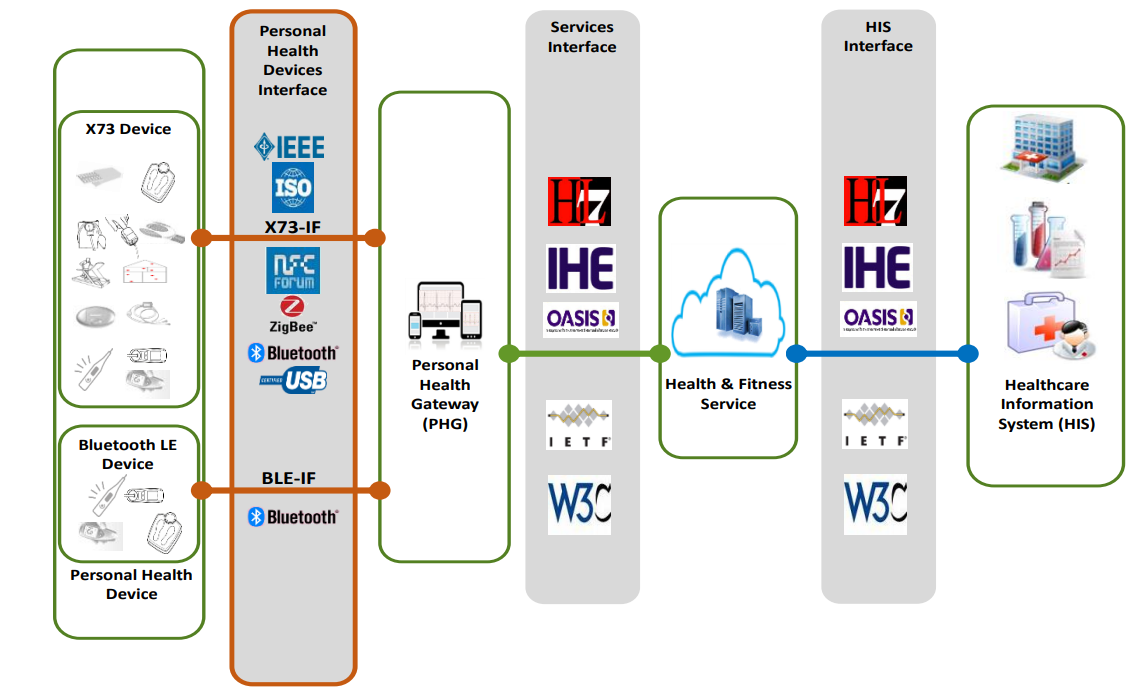
- Status: In force
- Year started: 2013
- Latest version: 4 November 2019
- Organization: ITU-T
- Committee: ITU-T Study Group 16
- Related standards: H.870
- Domain: Connected health, Wearable technology, Medical device connectivity
- License: Freely available
- Website: https://www.itu.int/rec/T-REC-H.810

H.810, "E-health multimedia systems, services and applications - Personal health systems", also known as the Continua Design Guidelines (CDG), is an ITU-T Recommendation, developed in collaboration with the World Health Organization. It specifies standards for Connected health was first approved in 2013. In November 2019, version 4 was approved and published.

== Guidelines ==
The Guidelines are a set of standards and guidelines developed by the Continua Health Alliance (now part of the Personal Connected Health Alliance) to enable the interoperability of personal connected health devices and systems. These guidelines were established to ensure that medical devices, systems, and applications can communicate with each other, exchange data, and provide integration across various healthcare scenarios.

The main objectives of the Guidelines are:

1. Interoperability: The guidelines help ensure that devices, systems, and applications from different manufacturers can work together seamlessly, enabling the exchange of health-related data.
2. Security and Privacy: The guidelines outline best practices for maintaining the security and privacy of personal health data, addressing aspects like data encryption, access control, and user authentication.
3. Ease of Use: The guidelines aim to ensure that personal connected health devices are easy to use and accessible to people with varying levels of technical expertise, promoting the adoption of these technologies by a wide range of users.
4. Standards-Based Approach: The guidelines are built on existing industry standards and protocols, such as Bluetooth, USB, and ISO/IEEE 11073, to leverage existing technology and promote widespread adoption.
5. Certification: The Continua Health Alliance provides a certification program for products that adhere to the Continua Design Guidelines, ensuring that they meet the required standards for interoperability, security, and ease of use.

== Inter-Agency Collaboration on Digital Health ==
H.810 and the work on connected health is part of the Inter-Agency Collaboration between the ITU and the World Health Organization on Digital health, which is undertaken primarily through ITU-T Study Group 16.

== Impact ==
The guidelines are reported to have saved lives in a study that monitors the cardial health of survivors of the 2011 earthquake in Japan.
