= ITU-T Study Group 15 =

Network standardization body

ITU-T Study Group 15: Transport
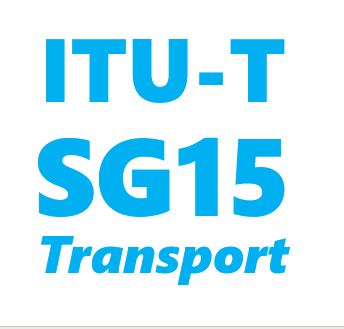
- Abbreviation: SG15
- Formation: 1997
- Type: Standards organization
- Purpose: Networks, Technologies and Infrastructures for Transport, Access and Home
- Location: Geneva, Switzerland
- Region served: Worldwide
- Chairman: Glenn Parsons
- Secretary: Hiroshi Ota
- Parent organization: World Telecommunication Standardization Assembly (ITU-T)
- Website: www.itu.int/go/tsg15

The ITU-T Study Group 15 (SG15) 'Transport' is a standardization committee of ITU-T concerned with networks, technologies and infrastructures for transport, access and home. It responsible for standards such as GPON, G.fast, etc.

Administratively, SG15 is a statutory meeting of the World Telecommunication Standardization Assembly (WTSA), which creates the ITU-T Study Groups and appoints their management teams. The secretariat is provided by the Telecommunication Standardization Bureau (under Director Chaesub Lee).

The goal of SG15 is to produce recommendations (international standards) for networks.

== Area of work ==
SG15 focuses on developing standards and recommendations related to optical transport networks, access network transport, and associated technologies.

Some of the key responsibilities of SG15 include:

1. Developing international standards for optical and transport networks, which covers fiber-optic communication systems, dense wavelength division multiplexing (DWDM), and synchronization aspects.
2. Addressing issues related to access network transport, such as digital subscriber lines (DSL), gigabit-capable passive optical networks (GPON), and Ethernet passive optical networks (EPON).
3. Developing recommendations for network management, control, and performance monitoring, as well as resilience, protection, and restoration mechanisms.
4. SG15 collaborates with other ITU-T study groups, regional standardization bodies, and industry stakeholders to ensure a comprehensive and coordinated approach to global telecommunication standardization.

== See also ==
- ITU-T
