= H.870 =

ITU-T Recommendation

- Guidelines for safe listening devices/systems
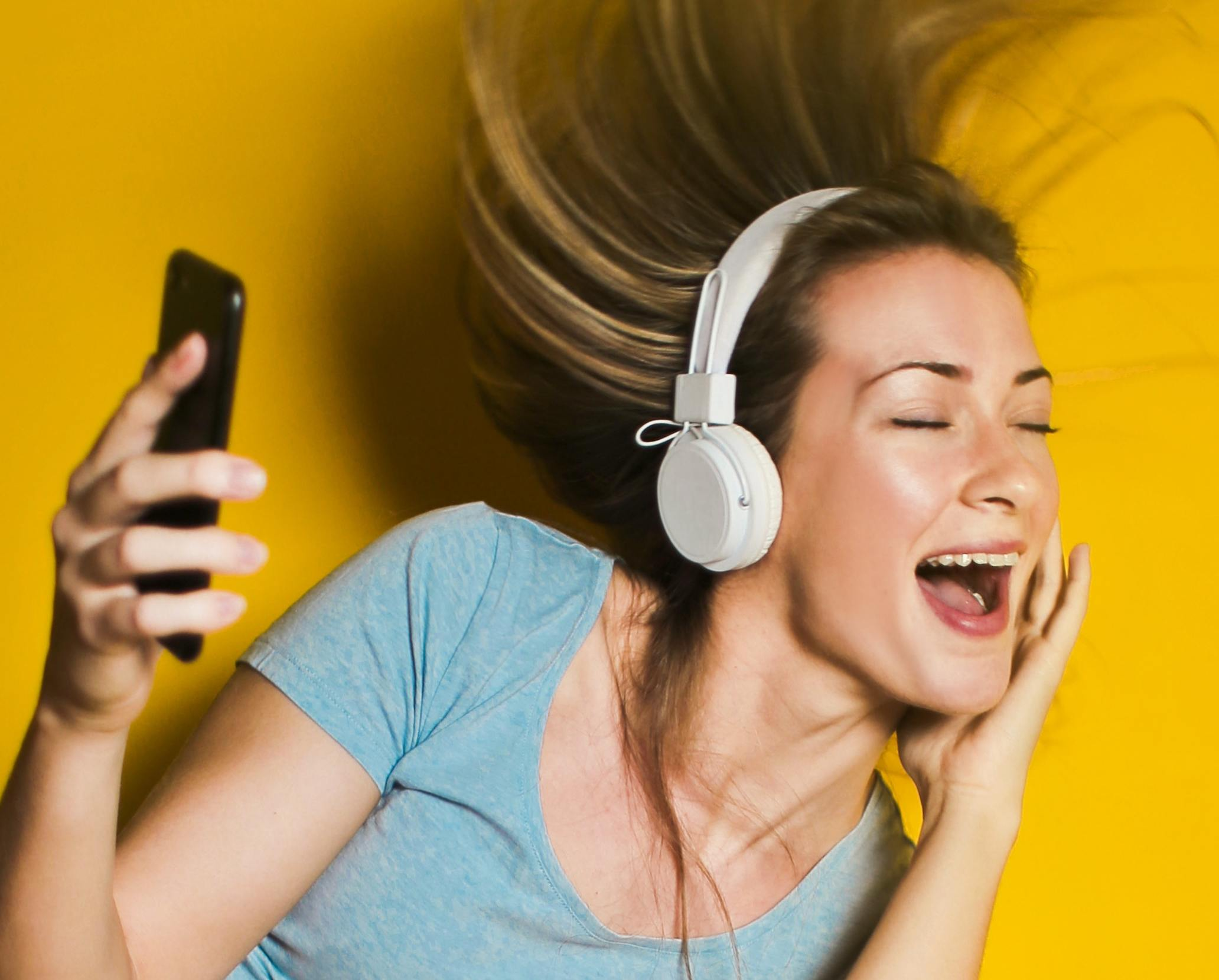
- Status: In force
- Year started: 2018
- Latest version: 1.1; 9 March 2019
- Organization: ITU-T
- Committee: ITU-T Study Group 16 (Secretary: Simao Campos)
- Related standards: V.18, H.810
- Domain: Sound, Hearing loss
- License: Freely available
- Website: https://www.itu.int/rec/T-REC-H.870

H.870 "Guidelines for safe listening devices/systems" (formerly F.SLD) is an ITU-T Recommendation, developed in collaboration with the World Health Organization. It specifies standards for safe listening to prevent hearing loss and was first approved in 2018. In March 2022, version 2 was approved and published.

== Apps ==
In order to make the Guidelines available as widely as possible, the WHO released Android and iOS apps.

== Toolkit ==
In order to ensure widespread implementation of this standard, WHO, ITU-T and ITU-D’s Digital Inclusion Programme developed a Toolkit for Safe Listening Devices and Systems.

== Inter-Agency Collaboration on Digital Health ==
H.870 and the work on safe listening is part of the Inter-Agency Collaboration between the ITU and the World Health Organization on Digital health, which is undertaken primarily through ITU-T Study Group 16 and the ITU-WHO Focus Group on Artificial Intelligence for Health (FG-AI4H).
