= Continua Health Alliance =

- Industry: Trade association
- Founded: June 2006
- Headquarters: Beaverton, Oregon, United States
- Area served: Worldwide
- Key people: Horst Merkle; (President and Chairman); Robert Havasy; (Executive Director)
- Website: ContinuaAlliance.org

Continua Health Alliance is an international non-profit, open industry group of nearly 240 healthcare providers, communications, medical, and fitness device companies. Continua was a founding member of Personal Connected Health Alliance which was launched in February 2014 with other founding members mHealth SUMMIT and HIMSS.

== Overview ==
Continua Health Alliance is an international not-for-profit industry organization enabling end-to-end, plug-and-play connectivity of devices and services for personal health management and healthcare delivery. Its mission is to empower information-driven health management and facilitate the incorporation of health and wellness into the day-to-day lives of consumers. ts activities include a certification and brand support program, events and collaborations to support technology and clinical innovation, as well as outreach to employers, payers, governments and care providers. With nearly 220 member companies reaching across the globe, Continua comprises technology, medical device and healthcare industry leaders and service providers dedicated to making personal connected health a reality.

Continua Health Alliance is working toward establishing systems of interoperable telehealth devices and services in three major categories: chronic disease management, aging independently, and health and physical fitness.

== Devices and services ==
Continua Health Alliance version 1 design guidelines are based on proven connectivity technical standards and include Bluetooth for wireless and USB for wired device connection. The group released the guidelines to the public in June 2009.

The group is establishing a product certification program using the Continua Certified Logo, indicating that it is compliant with other Continua-certified products. Products made under Continua Health Alliance guidelines will provide consumers with increased assurance of interoperability between devices, enabling them to more easily share information with caregivers and service providers.

Through collaborations with government agencies and other regulatory bodies, Continua works to provide guidelines for the effective management of diverse products and services from a global network of vendors. Continua Health Alliance products make use of the ISO/IEEE 11073 Personal Health Data (PHD) Standards.

Continua design guidelines are not available to the public without signing a Non-disclosure agreement. Continua's guidelines are designed to provide a framework for developing interoperability between devices and services.

== Milestones ==
Continua Health Alliance was founded on June 6, 2006

Continua Health alliance performed its first public demonstration of interoperability on October 27, 2008, at the Partners Center for Connected Health 5th Annual Connected Health Symposium in Boston.

Continua Health Alliance certified its first product, the Nonin 2500 PalmSAT handheld pulse oximeter with USB, on January 26, 2009.

By the end of December 2014 there are more than 100 certified products.

Continua selected Bluetooth Low Energy and Zigbee wireless protocols as the wireless standards for its Version 2 Design Guidelines which have been released. Bluetooth Low Energy is to be used for low-power mobile devices. Zigbee will be used for networked low-power sensors such as those enabling independent living.

Beginning in 2012, Continua invites non-members to request a copy of its Design Guidelines after signing a non-disclosure agreement.

Continua has working groups and operations in the U.S., EU, Japan, India and China.

== Members ==
Continua Health Alliance currently has nearly 220 member companies.

Continua's board of directors is currently composed of the following companies:

- Fujitsu
- Intel Corporation
- Oracle Corporation
- Orange
- Philips
- Qualcomm
- Roche Diagnostics
- Sharp
- UnitedHealth Group

=== Organisational structure ===
The organisation is primarily staffed by volunteers from the member organisations that are organised into working groups that address the goals of the alliance. Below the board of directors sit the following main working groups:

- Emerging Markets Working Group
- EU Working Group
- Global Development and Outreach Working Group
- Marketing Council
- Market Adoption Working Group
- Regulatory Working Group
- Technical Working Group
- Test & Certification Work Group
- Use Case Working Group
- U.S. Policy Working Group

=== Relevant standards ===
- ISO/IEEE 11073
- ISO/IEEE 11073 Personal Health Data (PHD) Standards
- Bluetooth
- USB
- HL7
- Integrating the Healthcare Enterprise
- Zigbee

=== Website ===
The Continua Alliance website contains a full listing of member organisations, a directory of qualified products, and a clear statement of their mission.

== See also ==
- Connected Health
- eHealth
- Telehealth
- Telemedicine
- Health 2.0
- H.810
