= ITU-T Study Group 16 =

Multimedia standardization body

ITU-T Study Group 16: Multimedia
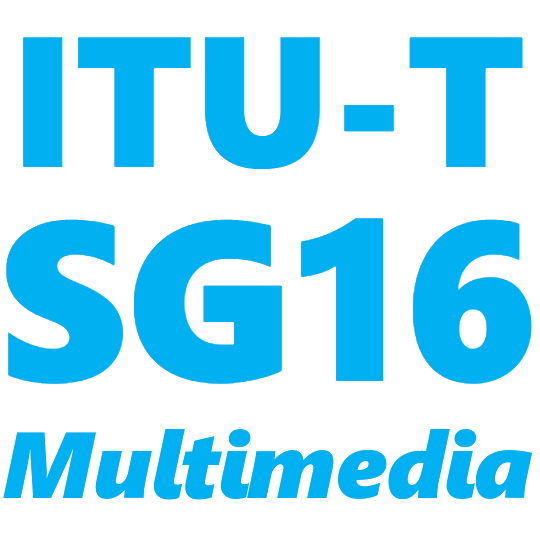
- ITU-T Study Group 16 Multimedia
- Abbreviation: SG16
- Formation: 1997
- Type: Standards organization
- Purpose: Multimedia coding, systems and applications
- Location: Geneva, Switzerland
- Region served: Worldwide
- Chairman: Noah Luo
- Secretary: Simao Campos
- Key people: Seizo Onoe, Gary Sullivan, Thomas Wiegand
- Publication: H.264, H.265, H.266, JPEG, H.870
- Parent organization: World Telecommunication Standardization Assembly (ITU-T)
- Subsidiaries: VCEG, ITU-WHO Focus Group on Artificial Intelligence for Health
- Affiliations: ITU-T Study Group 17, ISO/IEC JTC 1
- Website: www.itu.int/go/tsg16

The ITU-T Study Group 16 (SG16) is a statutory group of the ITU Telecommunication Standardization Sector (ITU-T) concerned with multimedia coding, systems and applications, such as video coding standards. It is responsible for standardization of the "H.26x" line of video coding standards, the "T.8xx" line of image coding standards, and related technologies, as well as various collaborations with the World Health Organization, including on safe listening (H.870) accessibility of e-health (F.780.2), it is also the parent body of VCEG and various Focus Groups, such as the ITU-WHO Focus Group on Artificial Intelligence for Health and its AI for Health Framework.

Administratively, SG16 is a statutory meeting of the World Telecommunication Standardization Assembly (WTSA), which creates the ITU-T Study Groups and appoints their management teams. The secretariat is provided by the Telecommunication Standardization Bureau (under Director Seizo Onoe). WTSA instructed ITU to hold the Global Standards Symposium as a part of the deliberations that is open to the public.

The goal of SG16 is to produce Recommendations (international standards) for multimedia, including e.g. video coding, audio coding and image coding methods, such as H.264, H.265, H.266, and JPEG, as well as other types of multimedia related standards such as F.780.2, H.810, and H.870 on safe listening, together with the World Health Organization. It is also responsible for "the coordination of related studies across the various ITU-T SGs." Additionally, is also the lead study group on ubiquitous and Internet of Things (IoT) applications; telecommunication/ICT accessibility for persons with disabilities; intelligent transport system (ITS) communications; e-health; and Internet Protocol television (IPTV).

== Trustworthy AI ==
Together with ITU-T Study Group 17 and AI for Good, the study group has been developing technology specifications under Trustworthy AI. Including items on homomorphic encryption, secure multi-party computation, and federated learning.

== See also ==
- ITU Telecommunication Standardization Sector
- Joint Photographic Experts Group (JPEG)
- Video Coding Experts Group (VCEG)
- Moving Picture Experts Group (MPEG)
- Thomas Wiegand
- Gary Sullivan (engineer)
- Video codec
- Video compression
- Video quality
