= Accessibility of telehealth services =

ITU-T Recommendation

- Abbreviation: F.780.2
- Status: In force
- Year started: 2018
- Latest version: 1.0; March 2022
- Organization: ITU (T)
- Committee: ITU-T Study Group 16 (Secretary: Simao Campos)
- Related standards: IEC 60601, IEC 61000-3-2, K.127, K.136, K.137
- License: Freely available
- Website: https://www.itu.int/rec/T-REC-F.780.2

Accessibility of telehealth services or F.780.2 is a technical standard developed by the World Health Organization and ITU (Study Group 16) that defines accessibility requirements for technical features to be used and implemented by governments, healthcare providers and manufacturers of telehealth platforms to facilitate the access and use of telehealth services by persons with disabilities.

== Definition ==
World Health Organization (WHO) defines telehealth as the "delivery of health care services, where patients and providers are separated by distance.

== Overview ==
1. Requirements 1 to 6 for persons with vision impairment and blindness
2. Requirements 7 to 11 for deaf and hard of hearing persons
3. Requirement 12 for persons with speech difficulties
4. Requirements 13 to 15 for persons with mobility impairments
5. Requirements 16 to 20 for persons with mental health conditions and psychosocial disabilities
6. Requirements 21 to 23 for persons with developmental and intellectual disabilities
7. Requirements 24 and 25 for persons with learning disabilities

== See also ==
- Web accessibility
- Persons with disabilities
- World Health Organization
- International Telecommunication Union
