= Medical device connectivity =

Communications in a medical setting

Medical device connectivity is the establishment and maintenance of a connection through which data is transferred between a medical device, such as a patient monitor, and an information system. The term is used interchangeably with biomedical device connectivity or biomedical device integration. By eliminating the need for manual data entry, potential benefits include faster and more frequent data updates, diminished human error, and improved workflow efficiency.

Medical devices may be connected on wireless and wired networks. Wireless networks, including Wi-Fi, Wireless Medical Telemetry Service, and Bluetooth, provide more ubiquitous coverage of connectivity, allowing uninterrupted monitoring of patients in transit. Wired networks are fast, stable, and highly available. Wired networks are usually more costly to install at first and require ongoing costs for maintenance, but allow connectivity of the organization in a closed environment.

== Interoperability of devices ==
Adherence to standards ensures interoperability within a network of medical devices. In most cases, the clinical environment is heterogenous; devices are supplied by a variety of vendors, allowing for different technologies to be utilized. Achieving interoperability can be difficult, as data format and encryption varies among vendors and models. The following standards enable interoperability between connected medical device.

- CEN ISO/IEEE 11073* enables the communication between medical devices and external information systems. This standard provides plug-and-play interoperability between devices, and facilitates the efficient exchange of data acquired at the point of care in all care environments.
- IEEE 802.11 a/b/g/n are standards for implementing a wireless local area network (WLAN) in 2.4 GHz and 5 GHz frequency bands, utilizing the same basic protocol.

Regulatory organizations and industrial associations, such as Integrating the Healthcare Enterprise (IHE) initiative and Continua Health Alliance, are working towards standardized vendor-neutral device integration systems. The IHE provides a single set of internationally harmonized medical device informatics and interoperability standards as a unitary reference point for the industry. The IHE collaborates with Continua Health Alliance regarding data exchange protocol and device specializations.

The IHE Patient Care Device (PCD) Technical Framework Volumes 1-3 defines the established standards profiles, such as the integration, transaction and semantic content profiles respectively for complete, enterprise-wide integration and interoperability of health information systems. Several profiles have applications in medical device connectivity including the following:

- [DEC] Device Enterprise Communication - supports publication of information from point-of-care medical devices to applications such as clinical information systems and electronic health record systems, using a consistent Health Level Seven version 2 (HL7 v.2) messaging format and device semantic content or DICOM profile.
- [ACM] Alarm Communication Management - ensures the right alarm with the right priority to the right individuals with the right content.
- [DEC-SPD] Subscribe to Patient Data - supports a filtering mechanism for data transaction.
- [PIV] Point-of-care Infusion Verification - supports communication of a 5-Rights validated medication delivery / infusion order (from Bar Code Medication Administration (BCMA) system, also known as Barcode Point of Care (BPOC) system, to an infusion pump or pump management system
- [RTM] Rosetta Terminology Mapping - is based on the ISO/IEEE 11073 semantic standards converting vendor specific terms into harmonized standard terms. It uses a set of tools (Excel spreadsheets & XML files) to map the proprietary semantics communicated by medical devices to a standard representation using ISO/IEEE 11073 semantics.
- [IDCO] Implantable Device – Cardiac – Observation (IDCO)* profile - specifies a mechanism for transmission, and processing of discrete data elements and report attachments associated with cardiac device observations.

== Medical Device Integration Software ==
Hospitals have many different makes and models of medical devices. Each department has different types of devices, and rarely does an entire hospital run the same brand device. Because of the large number of devices, and the varying formats that data is exchanged (RS-232, HL7, Bluetooth, WiFi), Medical Device Integration software has become a critical component to integrating this vital patient data.

== Positive Patient Identification and Connectivity ==
Patient confidentiality can be compromised when the device data is transmitted to the wrong electronic health record. A positive patient identification at the point of care can be ensured through bar-code identifiers and radiofrequency identifiers.

- Bar-code Identification - Patient data is encoded within a bar-code on the patient's identification bracelet. Device identifying data is encoded within a bar-code attached to the device. Scanning the patient bar-code in conjunction with the medical device bar-code, ensures a patient-device association.
- Radiofrequency Identification - Patient and device identifying information is encoded within an RFID tag. This information is detected, and the clinician is prompted to confirm the patient-device association. RFID is a more efficient method of positive patient identification when there are multiple devices in use.

== Security Issues in Medical Device Connectivity ==
Security issues may arise in medical networking for many reasons. The following is a list of security challenges particular to medical devices:

- Medical devices often operate with commercial central processing units, operating systems, or off-the-shelf software, which place them at risk of cyber threat.
- Due to tight regulations surrounding medical devices, upgrades to software and security installations must be approved by the manufacturer, resulting in delays.
- Device operating systems are often early generation and may no longer be supported.
- Homogenous device environments facilitate rapid spread of computer virus.
- Devices may have limited memory, necessitating the use of scaled back versions of operating systems, making it more difficult to utilize common security software.

== Relevant organizations ==
- Association for the Advancement of Medical Instrumentation(AAMI)
- Health Level 7(HL7)
- CEN/TC 251
- ISO/TC 215 (Health Informatics)
