= Global Standards Symposium =

International 4-yearly conference

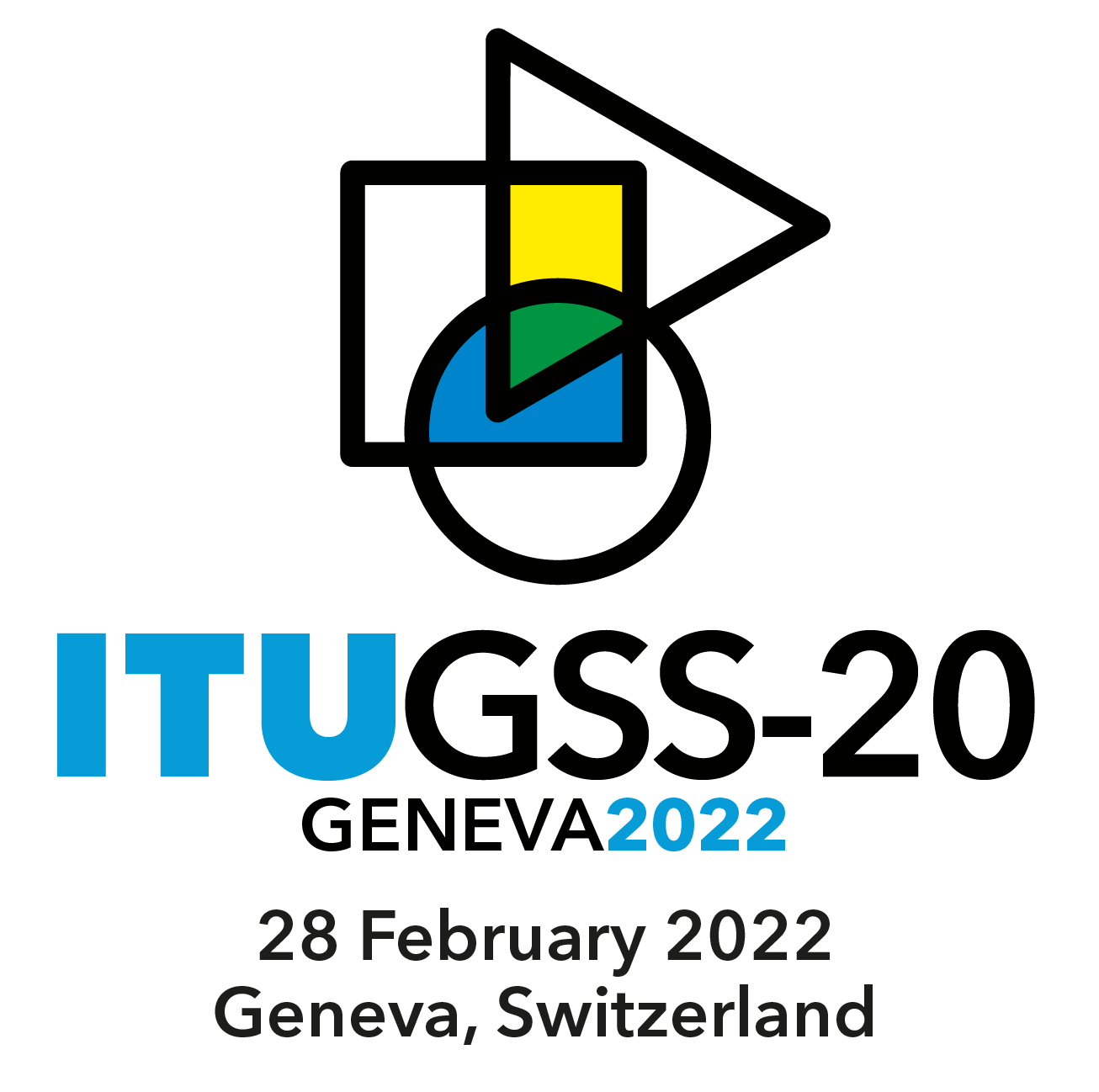
- Date: 28 February 2022
- Location: Geneva, Switzerland
- Also known as: GSS
- Related event: World Telecommunication Standardization Assembly
- Website: https://gss.itu.int

The Global Standards Symposium (GSS) is a statutory meeting that precedes the World Telecommunication Standardization Assembly (a quadrennial conference of the International Telecommunication Union, ITU). GSS provides a high-level forum for discussion and coordination open to all. The GSS was created by the ITU's treaty-making conference, the Plenipotentiary Conference 2006 in Antalya, Turkey with Resolution 122.

== ITU Plenipotentiary Conference 2006 ==
Upon the instruction of the ITU Plenipotentiary Conference (2006, Antalya) the organisation of a Global Standards Symposium as a public forum, to take place before any World Telecommunication Standardization Assembly, was decided (Resolution 122).

== GSS 08 ==
The first Global Standards Symposium (GSS 08) was held on 20 October 2008 in Johannesburg, South Africa. The Symposium was opened by Minister of Telecommunications of South Africa Ivy Matsepe-Casaburri.

== GSS 12 ==
The second Global Standards Symposium (GSS 12) was held on 18 November 2012 in Dubai, United Arab Emirates. The symposium was opened by ITU Secretary-General Hamadoun Touré.

== GSS 16 ==
The third Global Standards Symposium (GSS 16) was held on 24 October 2016 in Hammamet, Tunisia. The symposium was opened by the Minister of Telecommunications of Tunisia Dr Anouar Maârouf. Speakers included:

- Mongi Marzoug
- Houlin Zhao
- Chaesub Lee

== GSS 20 ==
GSS 20 was scheduled to be held in Hyderabad, India in 2020, but due to the COVID-19 pandemic it was rescheduled and took place on 28 February 2022 at International Conference Centre Geneva (CICG) in Geneva, Switzerland. The theme of GSS-20 was "International standards to enable the digital transformation and achieve the Sustainable Development Goals (SDGs)". The GSS conclusions were forwarded to WTSA-20 for consideration.

Speakers at the symposium included:

- Nele Leosk (Symposium Chair) Ambassador-at-Large for Digital Affairs, Ministry of Foreign Affairs, Estonia
- Ghana Minister Ursula Owusu
- Tunisia Minister Nizar Ben Néji
- South Africa Minister Khumbudzo Ntshavheni
- Costa Rica Vice Minister Teodoro Willink Castro
- UNECE Executive Secretary Oľga Algayerová
- ITU-T Director Chaesub Lee
- Valencia Major Joan Ribó
- Jean Todt, UN Special Envoy for Road Safety
- Fraunhofer HHI Executive Director Thomas Wiegand
- Marcus Shingles, CEO, Exponential Destiny
- Philippe Metzger, General Secretary, International Electrotechnical Commission
- Hossam El-Gamal, Executive President, National Telecom Regulatory Authority, Egypt
- Javier Garcia Diaz, Director General, Spanish Association for Standardization, Spain
- Jung Hae-Yong, Vice Mayor for Economic Affairs, Daegu, Republic of Korea
- Martín Olmos, Undersecretary of Information and Communications Technology, Argentina
- Gil Reichen, Mayor, Pully, Switzerland
