= Defense Centers of Excellence for Psychological Health and Traumatic Brain Injury =

Defence organization in United States

The Defense Centers of Excellence for Psychological Health and Traumatic Brain Injury (DCoE) is a United States Department of Defense (DoD) organization that provides guidance across DoD programs related to psychological health (PH) and traumatic brain injury (TBI) issues. The organization's official mission is to "improve the lives of our nation’s service members, families and veterans by advancing excellence in psychological health and traumatic brain injury prevention and care."

== History ==
Eight different blue ribbon panels and commissions were established in 2007 to examine PTSD, TBI and other combat-related health issues. Policy makers, federal agency representatives, war veterans, academics, health care experts and medical scientists from a number of disciplines convened to address the care of warriors and their families. DCoE was created in response to several of 300-plus key recommendations that were generated, as well as recommendations from the 2008 National Defense Authorization Act. Deputy Secretary of Defense, Gordon England, announced the opening of DCoE in November 2007.

== Overview ==
DCoE focuses on education and training; clinical care; prevention; research; and service member, family and community outreach. In collaboration with the Department of Veterans Affairs, the organization supports the Department of Defense’s commitment of caring for service members from the time they enter service and throughout the completion of their service. DCoE also seeks to mitigate the stigma that still deters some from reaching out for help for problems such as post-traumatic stress disorder and TBI.

The organization has a leadership role in collaborating with a national network of external entities including non-profit organizations, other DoD agencies, academia, Congress, military services and other federal agencies. Public health service and civil service workers, including personnel from the Department of Veterans Affairs and individuals from all the military services, as well as contract personnel comprise the staff of DCoE.

DCoE offers a variety of services to benefit service members, families and veterans. The organization maintains a 24/7 outreach center staffed by health resource consultants who provide psychological health and TBI information, resources and referrals for service members, veterans and their families. According to an official summary of the organization, "the outreach center also supports the Real Warriors Campaign, an initiative launched by DCoE to promote the processes of building resilience, facilitating recovery and supporting reintegration of returning service members, veterans and their families. The campaign promotes help-seeking behavior among service members and veterans with invisible wounds and encourages the awareness and use of available resources."

DCoE is composed of three centers: Defense and Veterans Brain Injury Center (DVBIC), Deployment Health Clinical Center (DHCC), and the National Center for Telehealth & Technology (T2).
