= ITU-T Study Group 17 =

Standardization body focused on cyberseucirty standards, (e.g. X.509)

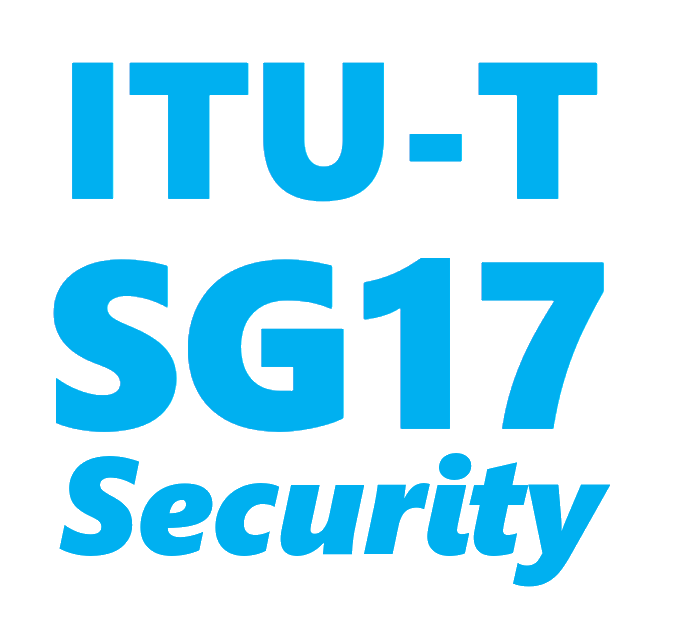
- Abbreviation: SG17
- Formation: 1984
- Type: Standards organization
- Purpose: Security
- Location: Geneva, Switzerland
- Region served: Worldwide
- Chair: Arnaud Taddei
- Secretary: Xiaoya Yang
- Key people: Seizo Onoe
- Publication: ASN.1, X.509
- Parent organization: World Telecommunication Standardization Assembly (ITU-T)
- Affiliations: ISO/IEC JTC 1
- Website: www.itu.int/go/tsg17

The ITU-T Study Group 17 (SG17) is a statutory group of the ITU Telecommunication Standardization Sector (ITU-T) concerned with security. The group is concerned with a broad range of security-related standardization issues such as cybersecurity, security management, security architectures and frameworks, countering spam, identity management, biometrics, protection of personally identifiable information, and the security of applications and services for the Internet of Things (IoT). It is responsible for standardization of i.a. ASN.1 and X.509, it was also the parent body of the Focus Group on Quantum Information Technology (FG-QIT). The group is currently chaired by Arnaud Taddei of Broadcom Europe.

Administratively, SG17 is a statutory meeting of the World Telecommunication Standardization Assembly (WTSA), which creates the ITU-T Study Groups and appoints their management teams. The secretariat is provided by the Telecommunication Standardization Bureau (under Director Seizo Onoe).

== Standards ==
- ASN.1
- X.500
- X.509
- X.800
- X.1035
- X.1205
- X.1277
- X.1280
- RM-ODP
- OSI model

== Trustworthy AI ==
Together with other ITU-T Study Groups and AI for Good, the study group has been developing technology specifications under Trustworthy AI. Including items on homomorphic encryption, secure multi-party computation, and federated learning.

== See also ==
- International Telecommunication Union
- ITU Telecommunication Standardization Sector
- ASN.1
- X.509
