= Digital health =

Application of digital technologies to healthcare

Digital health is a discipline that includes digital care programs, technologies with health, healthcare, living, and society to enhance the efficiency of healthcare delivery and to make medicine more personalized and precise. It uses information and communication technologies to facilitate understanding of health problems and challenges faced by people receiving medical treatment and social prescribing in more personalised and precise ways. The definitions of digital health and its remits overlap in many ways with those of health and medical informatics.

Worldwide adoption of electronic medical records has been on the rise since 1990. Digital health is a multi-disciplinary domain involving many stakeholders, including clinicians, researchers and scientists with a wide range of expertise in healthcare, engineering, social sciences, public health, health economics and data management.

Digital health technologies include both hardware and software solutions and services, including telemedicine, wearable devices, augmented reality, and virtual reality. Generally, digital health interconnects health systems to improve the use of computational technologies, smart devices, computational analysis techniques, and communication media to aid healthcare professionals and their patients manage illnesses and health risks, as well as promote health and wellbeing.

Although digital health platforms enable rapid and inexpensive communications, critics warn against potential privacy violations of personal health data and the role digital health could play in increasing the health and digital divide between social majority and minority groups, possibly leading to mistrust and hesitancy to use digital health systems.

== Elements ==
The prominence of Digital health in the past century has culminated for the emergence of three reasons, stated by both Professor John Powell and Professor Theodoros N Arvanitis "the development of new technologies... and also trends towards smart, wearable and pervasive technologies; the need for health services to find new approaches to addressing the demands of an ageing population... and the role of the empowered patient and the shift in models of health service delivery towards patient-centred care, and patient-led care." These three points have directed and motivated the rise in the elements that play a crucial role in the creation of Digital health care services.

=== Primary Care Services ===
The first group of these services is known as primary care services in the domain of digital health. These services include wireless medical devices that utilize technology such as Wi-Fi or Bluetooth, as well as applications on mobile devices that encourage the betterment of an individual's health as well as applications that promote overall general wellness. For example, researchers developed a digital service to help elderly people with balance disorder and risk of falling. As prominent sociologist Deborah Lupton states, "Health promoters have experimented with using text messages, social media sites and apps to disseminate information about preventive health, collect data about people's health-related behaviours and attempt to 'nudge' members of target groups to change their behaviour in the interests of their health." In other words, Lupton states that various media technologies that can be found on mobile devices are being utilized to try and better certain groups' behaviors in concern with digital health.

=== Acute Care Services ===
The second group of these services is known as acute care in the digital health domain. These services include telemedicine which is defined as handling patients over some sort of streaming device and is targeted towards areas where the population is more widely scattered, medical devices that incorporate different aspects of software otherwise known as SaMD, and examples of these devices are pacemakers. The final example of acute care services is the 'interoperability' of 'Health IT, Cybersecurity, and Medical Devices', Health IT is how the electronic database stores, processes, and analyses personal health information and how this information can be utilized by medical personnel and organizations around the world of easier access of information, Cybersecurity which then plays into the storing of personal health information in how this information is secured and protected in the interest of personal safety of the individuals whose information is being stored, and Medical Devices that are able to communicate within each other to better care for a patient by transmitting what needs to be done on one machine to another. Sociologist Deborah Lupton states "However, members of some social groups are currently excluded from full participation in the digital health ecosystem. Mechanisms for facilitating further consultation between the various stakeholders involved in digital health, including patients and carers, need to be established. The rights and responsibilities of the different stakeholders involved in connected digital health also need to be better identified and highlighted. At the same time, personal data privacy and security need protection." Lupton concludes that despite the innovation of various elements in this digital health area, there are still multiple issues that need to be organized and dealt with for the continuation of the revolution of Digital Health.

=== Other Digital Health Elements ===
The rest of the elements of Digital health that do not fall so squarely into acute or primary care services are listed as the transmission of medical education and information between practitioners and researchers through the utilization of digital technologies and applications that can be employed by doctors for risk-assessment regarding patients. Devices that can be utilized for the improvement and management of bodily purposes as well as the encouragement of the education of digital health to the public. There are also patient-based applications that can be utilized to share information by individual patients as well as encourage the usage of drug trials. The tracking of outbreaks of disease by the use of mass media that social media has developed has also come about through Digital Health. Finally the recording of the environment around sensor devices that are being utilized for the betterment of the community.

== Technologies ==
Digital health technologies come in many different forms and extend into various parts of healthcare. As new technologies develop, digital health, as a field, respectively transforms. The three most popular domains of digital health technologies include telemedicine, wearable technologies, and augmented and virtual reality. Telemedicine is how physicians treat patients remotely and the different technologies needed to make the process more efficient and faster. The other main side of digital health is data collection and how to provide on-demand medical information for patients, which gave rise to wearables. Wearable technologies hold the promise of bringing personalized data and health-related tracking to all users. In terms of digitized treatment, augmented and virtual reality can create personalized regimens for patients that can be repeated and tailored to treat many conditions.

In fact some of these technologies are being propelled by the startup space, which has been followed via Internet or online media sources such as podcasts on digital health entrepreneurs. The National Institute for Health and Care Research (NIHR) has published a review of research on how digital health technologies can help manage health conditions.

=== Electronic medical records (EMRs) ===
One of the most used E-health applications worldwide is electronic medical records (EMRs). Electronic medical records have multiple functions in the medical field. Some of the functions include documentation, communication, and management of patient data. Electronic medical records are the technological replacement for paper-based documentation, which is labor-intensive, repetitive, sometimes inaccurate, and time-consuming. Electronic Health Records (EHRs) are another E-health application used by physicians. However, despite the many similarities in both health applications, they are not the same. The main difference between the two is that EHRs have an additional feature which includes the ability to share the data for multiple authorized physicians.

=== Telemedicine ===
Telemedicine, also known as telehealth, is a way for patients to interact with their doctors virtually. According to the National Library of Medicine (NIH), the definition of telehealth is "the use of electronic information and communications technologies to provide and support health care when distance separates the participants." Telehealth is an umbrella term that encompasses various applications of electronics in medicine. The more common uses of technology involve calling patients to let them know their lab results are in or communication between emergency departments. On the other hand, there are more complex uses of technology called telesurgery. While there are two extremes of the uses of telehealth, the more recent applications of telehealth involve patient and healthcare-professional interaction.

==== Applications ====
There is a wide range of applications of telemedicine while having patient and doctor interaction. One example is disorders that do not require lab tests and investigations. One of the medical fields pertaining to this example is mental health. The only tools a patient needs are a phone, laptop, or device with video conferencing capabilities, allowing them to connect with their therapist to receive live consultations. Another application is virtual doctor's appointments. After the worldwide impact of COVID-19, patients' willingness to enter a doctor's office where there are germs and people with different health issues for a regular checkup is low. Through the use of video conferencing, telemedicine allows patients to have their yearly checkups from the comfort of their homes. This eliminates long wait times and commuting and provides a familiar environment for the patient to open up to the healthcare provider. Another application of telehealth involving patient care is dermatology. The patient can hold high-resolution devices to their skin and allow the dermatologist to gauge what needs to be addressed. Additionally, this method is ideal to conduct check-in visits that ensure rashes or skin conditions are healing properly. A 2025 systematic review found that audio-based telehealth, such as telephone consultations, has been found to be comparable to in-person or video-based care for managing chronic conditions, with some studies suggesting benefits for quality of life in cancer and noncardiac chest pain management. For diabetes management specifically, a 2025 systematic review found that supplementing usual care with audio-based interventions provided moderate certainty evidence for modest improvements in glycemic control (A1c reduction of 0.20%), with greater effectiveness when interventions included monthly contact and remote monitoring tools.

==== Benefits ====
The benefits of telehealth are vast and stem from its application. One of the benefits of telehealth is the time-saving element. Patients no longer have to think of wait times in hospitals and offices or spend commuting to and from doctors' appointments. Instead, they can log onto their device and see their healthcare professional virtually. This is especially beneficial for those who live in rural areas where specialized hospitals are scarce and far away. The public now has access to doctors who specialize in certain diseases instead of having to drive and commute long distances to have a simple consultation meeting. Additionally, patients no longer have to worry about taking an entire day off work for a regular health checkup. They can simply block out enough time that is required for their appointment which results in fewer travel costs, less need to find childcare services, and privacy. Another benefit of telehealth is the reduction in face-to-face contact. By using video conferencing, patients are less likely to contract germs from others at the hospital and limit the spread of germs themselves.

==== Limitations ====
Although vast in its benefits, due to the rapid expansion of telehealth during COVID-19, various limitations arise while using telemedicine. A common criticism of telehealth is that it can feel impersonal, as doctors and patients do not meet face-to-face. This lack of in-person communication can result in improper patient histories and physical examinations. a 2025 systematic review evaluated the role of audio-only telehealth in chronic disease management. While audio-based care can supplement existing treatment approaches, particularly for conditions like cancer and heart failure, the evidence remains of low certainty with potential benefits for underserved populations, such as older adults and rural communities, who may have limited access to video-based telehealth. It is important to remember that online visits should only occur when in-person care is not needed. Another obstacle to using telehealth is the potential for technical difficulties and concerns about security breaches. Moreover, the rules and regulations governing telemedicine vary by state and are always changing. According to The Journal for Nurse Practitioners, "The rapid expansion of telehealth, especially during the COVID-19 pandemic, paired with variable regulations and guidelines creates increased potential for liability and legal issues." A 2025 mixed-methods study among adults in Germany with low literacy skills found that limited technical abilities and language barriers were key obstacles to using digital health technologies, with video content and community support emerging as preferred sources of online health information.

=== Digital healthcare interventions ===
Digital healthcare interventions (DHI) has been used to a wide range of applications across various aspects of healthcare, such as self-management tools, where patients use applications and platforms to manage chronic conditions like diabetes or hypertension; self-education and health promotion tools, that provide educational material designed to leverage the population's knowledge regarding one specific health topic and promote healthy behaviors, and digital therapeutics (software-based interventions designed to prevent, manage, or treat medical disorders).

=== Wearable technology ===
Wearable technology comes in many forms, including smartwatches and on-body sensors. Smartwatches were one of the first wearable devices that promoted self-monitoring and were typically associated with fitness tracking. Many record health-related data, such as "body mass index, calories burnt, heart rate, physical activity patterns". Such technology is increasingly being available in conventional Smartphones including the iPhone IPhone, which contains a built in heart monitor. Beyond smartwatches, researchers are developing smart-related bodywear, like patches, clothes, and accessories, to administer "on-demand drug release". This technology can expand into smart implants for both severe and non-severe medical cases, where doctors will be able to create better, dynamic treatment protocols that would not have been possible without such mobile technology.

These technologies are used to gather data on patients at all times during the day. Since doctors no longer need to have their patients come into the office to collect the necessary data, being downloaded automatically, the data can lead to better treatment plans and patient monitoring. Doctors will have better knowledge into how well a certain medication is performing. They will also be able to continuously learn from this data and improve upon their original treatment plans to intervene when needed.

Wearables and the Internet of Medical Thingsref>"Emerging Trends in Digital Health through Wearables and IoT Devices". Emerging Trends in Digital Health through Wearables and IoT Devices.</ref>

The convergence of digital health with wearable technology and the Internet of Things (IoT) has led to the emergence of the Internet of Medical Things (IoMT). Unlike traditional healthcare, which often relies on episodic clinical visits, IoMT ecosystems utilize interconnected devices—such as smartwatches, continuous glucose monitors, and bio-patches- to facilitate the continuous, real-time tracking of physiological data. This constant stream of information allows for a shift from reactive to proactive care, enabling the early detection of health anomalies through predictive analytics and fostering personalized medicine by integrating patient-generated health data directly with clinical records.

=== Augmented and virtual reality ===
In digital health, augmented reality technology enhances real-world experiences with computerized sensory information and is used to build smart devices for healthcare professionals. Since the majority of patient-related information now comes from hand-held devices, smart glasses provide a new, hands-free augmented way for a doctor to view their patient's medical history. The applications of this technology can extend into data-driven diagnosis, augmented patient documentation, or even enhanced treatment plans, all by wearing a pair of smart glasses when treating a patient, although planning is recommended to ensure equity, and that the highest ethical standards are upheld as planning moves forward and regulatory frameworks are developed.

Another similar technology space is virtual reality, which creates interactive simulations that mimic real-life scenarios and can be tailored for personalized treatments. Many stroke victims lose range of motion and under standard treatment protocols; 55% to 75% of patients have long-term upper muscular dysfunction, as the lower body is primarily targeted during therapy. Repeated actions and the length of therapy are the two main factors that show positive progress towards recovery. Virtual reality technologies can create various 3D environments that are difficult to replace in real-life but are necessary to help patients retrain their motor movements. These simulations can not only target specific body parts, but can also increase in intensity as the patient improves and requires more challenging tasks.

=== Robotics ===
A wide range of robotic technology has been used in medical contexts, notably in robot-assisted surgery. A good example is the Da Vinci Robotic Surgery System, developed by Intuitive Surgery Da Vinci Surgical System. This semiautomatic robot allows a surgeon to remotely perform surgery. The robot performs incisions as directed the surgeon, who observes on screen.

=== Others ===
Other technologies include Assistive technologies, rehabilitation robotics, and unobtrusive monitoring sensors that can help people with disabilities perform their daily tasks independently. Computational simulations, modeling, and machine learning (e.g., FG-AI4H) approaches can model health-related outcomes. These advanced simulations can be repeated, replicated, and tailored to any research area. In medical imaging, the applications for this technology helps healthcare professionals visualize genes, brain structures, and many other components of human anatomy. The flexibility in this technology also allows for more positive and accurate results. Mobile health (or mhealth) is the practice of medicine and public health supported by mobile devices.

Health systems engineering is another subset of digital health that leverages other engineering industries to improve applications including knowledge discovery, decision making, optimization, human factors engineering, quality engineering, and information technology and communication. Speech and hearing systems for natural language processing, speech recognition techniques, and medical devices can aid in speech and hearing (e.g., cochlear implants). Digital hearing aids use various algorithms to reduce background noise and improve perceptual performance, which is a significant improvement from regular hearing implants.

The global digital health market was valued at $1109.2B in 2025 and is projected to grow at a 6.0% CAGR, reaching $2105.5B by 2036. Philips Healthcare (Connected Care) is the largest incumbent at 0.6% share (~$6.1B in sector revenue), and North America is the largest regional market at 42% share. The leading subsegment is hospitals & IDNs (acute care, AMCs running Epic/Oracle Health) at 38% of the market.

== Implementation ==
National electronic health record (EHR) systems exist to support healthcare, form meaningful indicators, and facilitate population-based studies by providing clinically procured data in an open-source and standardized digital format. These can inform public health decisions, which are especially crucial in low-resource settings. The World Health Organization's Global Observatory for eHealth (GOe) conducts and reports a worldwide survey of its 194 member nations on their progress toward EHR implementation and universal healthcare coverage. In their latest issue in 2015, 73 members (58%) reported having some eHealth strategy in place, a count that has increased since 1990. Within this cohort, high-income countries are overrepresented, as well as the majority are countries with universal health care (UHC).

National digital programs exist to support healthcare, such as those of Canada Health Infoway built on core systems of patient and provider registries, clinical and diagnostic imaging systems, clinical reports and immunizations. By 2014, 75% of Canadian physicians were using electronic medical records.

In Uganda and Mozambique, partnerships between patients with cell phones, local and regional governments, technologists, non-governmental organizations, academia, and industry have enabled mHealth solutions.

In the United Kingdom, the National Health Service (NHS) has commissioned a report on how to integrate digital healthcare technologies into the next generation of medicine. The "Topol Review" recommended an expansion of education for both patients and providers of next-generation technologies such as Whole Genome Sequencing, and has also created Digital Fellowships for health professionals. The United States has also embarked on a nationwide health study known as 'All of Us" to bring together a variety of health indicators in a digital format for researchers around the world.

On the other hand, the implementation of these innovations has brought to light societal risks and regulatory needs, which are challenging the current governance structures in the health sector.

=== Innovation cycle ===
The innovation process for digital health is an iterative cycle for technological solutions that can be classified into five main activity processes from the identification of the healthcare problem, research, digital solution, and evaluating the solution, to implementation in working clinical practices. Digital health may incorporate methods and tools adopted by software engineering, such as design thinking and agile software development. These commonly follow a user-centered approach to design, which are evaluated by subject-matter experts in their daily life using real-world data.

=== U.S. Food and Drug Administration ===
In 2019, the FDA published a Digital Health Innovation Action Plan that planned to reduce inefficiencies for physicians in an effort to cut overhead costs, improve access, increase quality of service, and make medicine more easily adapted for each person. Topics within the innovation plan include wireless devices, telemedicine, software, and cybersecurity. According to FDA guidelines, if you release an app designed to help someone with a medical condition, then that is considered a medical device. The FDA cannot regulate all healthcare apps, so they use "enforcement discretion", and up until 2020 they have chosen not to regulate all digital care programs and apps. However, programs that use the word treatment, seek to diagnose or treat a condition, or are deemed unsafe are and will be regulated by the FDA. During the COVID-19 pandemic, regulations and enforcement of digital psychiatry apps were relaxed to facilitate use and reduce in-person contact.

=== International Standards ===
At an intergovernmental level, the World Health Organization is the United Nations Specialized Agency for health, and the International Telecommunication Union is the UN Specialized Agency for ICTs. The agencies collaborate in their work on digital health, such as the H.870 standard on safe listening, as well as the ITU-WHO Focus Group on Artificial Intelligence for Health, a subsidiary of the ITU-T Study Group 16.

In traditional healthcare, doctors conducted medical practices with a limited number of tools and got more experienced over time. Since becoming a doctor required experience and knowledge, very few took up the profession. The lack of communication between people in different places caused new technology to spread slowly. Since doctors were seen as experts in their fields, patients would have very little choice in how they were treated. Although there has been extensive change in technology, the current health care system doesn't reflect the changes in treatments. In the 2010s, healthcare knowledge continued to grow rapidly, and patients began to get frustrated by the vast knowledge that physicians didn't know or use. The number of and the cost to treat chronic illnesses increased, and the World Health Organization estimated that there was a worldwide shortage of 4.3 million healthcare workers. During the transition from traditional healthcare to digital health, the amount of access to high-quality health technology and medical records and studies increased. The transition also gave patients the option of self-care because it changed the technology accessible to patients and the patients' ability to choose their way of treatment. Although this new way of treatment has given patients a role in treatment, it has led to difficulty with patients choosing the best treatment options. According to the article Digital Health is a Cultural Transformation of Traditional Healthcare from the National Library of Medicine, "The success of providing care depends on collaboration, empathy and shared decision making. What is needed for this is a newly defined co-operation between patients and their caregivers." In this quote, health care experts explain that they need to collaborate with patients and respect their decisions in choosing treatment options for them. The article then explains how a strong relationship between physicians and patients help influence what treatment options they choose, and how empathy is an important characteristic for physicians to have.

In May 2018, the World Health Organization passed a global strategy for digital health. There were four major goals for the strategy. The first goal was for nations and companies to collaborate more in making new treatments and technology. Two other main goals for the strategy were to increase the implementation of national strategies towards digital health, and to increase authority over digital health from global to national levels. The World Health Organization also made guidelines in regulating certifying digital health medical devices similar to how medicine and vaccines are tested. The strategy was also made to list health data as a public health good, and made an outline for how research and data are shared, and how Artificial Intelligence is used. It even endorsed people-centered health systems that used digital health. While the World Health Organization was pushing their strategy, other groups are also developing strategies to make digital health more available in communities that don't have it.

Before this strategy was published, the World Health Organization made a plan around the beginning of 2015 to use digital health to end Tuberculosis. The following reasons why this strategy was passed included how health care managers didn't have the resources for prevention of Tuberculosis. There was a need for a step to step plan to include digital health for the End TB Strategy. The plan would also give opportunity to improve health care technology and increase efficiency and sustainability of efforts. The plan focused on treating and preventing tuberculosis, and giving treatment options for patients suffering from Tuberculosis from national to international levels. the following steps included functional laboratory information included using digital technologies to diagnose patients, providing secure data transmission and storage, and using data to store patients' results. Some of the technologies used in the campaign were Video Treatment Support, and eHealth Portal.

== Criticisms ==
Digital healthcare presents a wide range of complex and sometimes novel regulatory challenges, including questions about how to balance public interest concerns against an individual's right to privacy as well as the risks of 'pseudo-experts' providing medical advice. Meanwhile, the explosion in the number of uses and applications seen during the COVID-19 pandemic has also brought to light the limitations of existing legislation and other regulatory tools to grapple with these concerns (or, in some cases, been enabled by changes in legislation that groups such as the Varieties of Democracy have argued have produced a 'pandemic backslide' in human rights protections).

=== Ownership of health data ===
At a global level, the implementation of digital health solutions depends on large data sets, ranging from simple statistics that record every birth and death to more sophisticated metrics that track diseases, outbreaks, and chronic conditions. These systems record data such as patient records, blood test results, EKGs, MRIs, billing records, drug prescriptions, and other private medical information. Medical professionals can use this data to make more data-driven decisions about patient care and consumers themselves can utilize it to make informed choices about their own health. Given the personal nature of the data being collected, a crucial debate has arisen amongst stake-holders about one of the challenges induced by digital health solutions: the ownership of health data. In most cases, governments and big data and technology companies are storing citizens' medical information, leaving many concerned with how their data is being used and/or who has access to it. This is further compounded by the fact that the details that answer these questions is oftentimes hidden in complex terms & conditions that are rarely read. A notable example of a data privacy breach in the digital health space took place in 2016. Google faced a major lawsuit over a data-sharing agreement that gave its artificial intelligence arm, DeepMind, access to the personal health data of 1.6 million British patients. Google failed to secure patient consent and guarantee the anonymity of the patients. Another concept is that data is considered as a form of public good. Researchers from Stanford University proposed the use of such a framework, to think about data and the development of AI; they were thinking about radiology data specifically. They concluded that clinical data should be a form of public good, used for the benefit of future patients and that the data should be widely available for the development of knowledge and tools to benefit future patients. From this, they drew three main conclusions. Firstly, if the clinical data is really not owned by anyone, those who interact with it then have an obligation to ensure that the data is used for the benefit of future patients in societies. Secondly, this data should be widely shared for research and development, and all the individuals and entities with access to that data, then essentially become stewards of that data and become responsible to carefully safeguard the privacy and to ensure that the data is used for developing knowledge and tools for the good. Thirdly, patient consent would not necessarily be required before the data is used for secondary purposes, such as AI development and training and testing, as long as there are mechanisms in place to ensure that ethical standards are being followed. According to this proposed framework, the authors propose that it would be unethical to sell data to the third parties by granting exclusive access in exchange for monetary or any kind of payments that exceed costs.

=== Misinterpretation of data ===
Although the data and information provided by personalized health platforms may give reassurance to users, they might simultaneously induce increased anxiety and obsessive behavior. As seen with platforms such as WebMD, the misinterpretation of data can further contribute to patient hysteria: Having increased access to information on oneself is not always positive. In an extreme scenario, patients might feel a misplaced sense of security knowing that they have this access, meaning that they won't seek medical advice or help from professionals, even if it is needed.

=== Institutional ageism ===
Older people are more likely to have chronic health issues, so they have a greater need to use a digital health platform. Digital health tools can be difficult for people who lack strong computer skills, and newer digital health tools may not work on familiar, older computer systems. This can perpetuate a digital divide and can result in systemic, institutionalized discrimination against older people. Older people represent an untapped user group for digital health tools.

=== Challenges in implementing digital health technologies ===
Multiple studies have shown challenges in implementing digital health technologies in a variety of settings. There is a need to rethink digital health technologies to accommodate diverse user requirements with flexible, adaptable tools. A robust implementation strategy and effective training programs are crucial for addressing specific needs and managing information overload. The often-overlooked importance of clinician experiences suggests that their insights can help navigate enduring challenges in digital health.

=== Digital divide ===
Worldwide, the UN estimates that 3.8 billion people are offline and even in the US, 19 million people do not have reliable connectivity access. Other barriers to access include a lack of basic digital literacy required to use many digital health platforms. As a result, the already existing health gap between low-income and high-income populations may become further exacerbated by up and coming health technologies. To be effective, digital health solutions must foster the development of health literacy skills amongst platform users to make sure that the technology is used as intended

=== Bio-surveillance risks ===
In the age of the COVID-19 pandemic, the use of digital health platforms as a means to contain the spread of the disease has been accelerated worldwide. Governments in many economies, including South Korea, Taiwan, India, Italy, Poland, and China, have implemented strict digital track and trace systems to both identify those infected with COVID-19 and to ensure that they obey quarantine guidelines.

Although some studies (such as one by the Asian Development Bank) have suggests that such programs have been beneficial in combating spread, some critics worry have continued to express strong concerns about the potential loss of civil liberties associated with individuals handing over their private health data to government entities; this includes whether new or emergency regulations will stay in place in a post-pandemic world.

=== Additional legal and regulatory issues ===
In the United States, the Health Insurance Portability and Accountability Act (HIPAA) of 1996 was the first comprehensive framework that aimed to protect the personal data of patients. In 2009, it was amended with the Health Information Technology for Economic and Clinical Health (HITECH) Act which seeks to examine personal health data privacy laws through the lens of the private sector and increase enforcement of HIPAA. Critics of these acts claim that they don't go far enough as there are still around 600,000 types of businesses that can access patient data without explicit consent. Not to mention, there are extensive reports proving that HIPAA regulations are constantly violated, making some wonder whether the government even has the capacity to enforce the laws that they put in place. With major companies like Facebook and Apple moving into digital health, critics question whether existing regulations are comprehensive enough.

=== Electronic Medical Records (EMRs) ===
Due to the initial gap between the expectations and performances of electronic medical records, they are frowned upon by clinicians. The initial failures have shaped physicians' perceptions of EMR. Therefore, before considering adopting the EMRs in the medical field, the quality of the information system has to be accounted for. Physicians that use the EMRs have a different view of how effective this new technology is and most of this has to do with age. Younger primary care physicians (PCP) find the technology easier to use as they have more knowledge about technology, therefore were inclined to use EMRs than older physicians with less knowledge of technology. Electronic medical records still have positive and negative implications for the medical field. Some of the positives of the EMRs in the medical field include the accuracy of results by both minimalizing the errors that used to occur as well as having more complete records. This leads to having a better quality of healthcare for patients because the guidelines are better followed. Not only that, but the efficiency of the work also increases because not only can the data be shared more readily, but also the time required to work on the medical records is less. However, there is contrary information which is that when it comes to data management and communication function, EMRs are less effective. Another positive is that there is better privacy for the records as they are harder to access by non-authoritative personnel. However, all these benefits are debatable because there is no tangible evidence that there has been an improvement in the quality of the work being performed by primary care physicians.

There are also negative consequences of using electronic medical records. Firstly, the place where the EMRs are being implemented would have to be financially capable as there is a very high cost of implementation. Additionally, the systems that are being used at the location would have to be modified so that the EMRs would be relevant and useful to the location. This implementation of EMRs would not be possible at locations that lack the resources to instruct physicians in charge of using the new E-health applications, especially in smaller or solo clinics. Not only that, but EMRs also are unable to factor in the social and psychological aspects of a patient into the record. To better understand how EMRs would compare with paper-based records in a hospital setting, a study was conducted between two hospitals and each of the hospitals adopted one of the methods. The results were that the quality of healthcare service in the hospital that had adopted the usage of EMRs was better than the other hospital. The quality of health care services is defined by how health results are improved. Multiple factors play a role in quality enhancement. Some factors are regarding the interaction between the patient and physician. For example, whether the patient gets assurance from the responses given by the physician.

=== Burden on healthcare providers' well-being ===
The integration of digital health has brought about considerable challenges for healthcare providers, and some physicians are highly critical of the utility of EMRs for patient care, and point to their rising use as a significant component in physician burnout. Other negative experiences and challenges encompass frustrations stemming from communication problems, reduced physician-patient interaction, inadequate resources, increased workloads, system complexity, difficulties in accessing information within Electronic Health Records (EHRs), and limited access to web-based information stored in digital systems. Additionally, clinicians often find themselves overwhelmed by the sheer volume of data and alerts generated by digital tools, which can hinder patient-centered care. In this digital healthcare landscape, emerging fears are prevalent, including the fear of change and potential job replacement, the fear of forgetting crucial patient information, and the fear of misinterpreting patient data. These fears contribute to increased stress and anxiety when new technologies are adopted. Furthermore, a sense of confusion is reported by some clinicians, stemming from a conflict between digital tools and their professional identity. This conflict revolves around concerns related to work visibility and perceived threats to professional autonomy.
