= X.1205 =

ITU-T recommendation

- Status: In force
- Year started: 2008
- Latest version: (04/08); April 2008
- Organization: ITU-T
- Committee: Study Group 17
- Website: https://www.itu.int/rec/T-REC-X.1205

X.1205 is a technical standard that provides an overview of cybersecurity, it was developed by the Standardization Sector of the International Telecommunication Union (ITU-T). The standard provides an overview of cybersecurity as well as a taxonomy of threats in cybersecurity.
