= Stephen Ibaraki =

Canadian writer

Stephen K. Ibaraki has been a teacher, an industry analyst, writer and consultant in the IT industry, and the former president of the Canadian Information Processing Society.

Currently, Ibaraki is a venture capitalist, entrepreneur, futurist and speaker. He is also the founder of the UN ITU AI for Good Global Summit, and a vicechair of the ITU-WHO Focus Group on Artificial Intelligence for Health, founding chair of the Financial Services Roundtable Tech Advisory Council, and founding chair of the International Federation for Information Processing Global Industry Council. Ibaraki serves as an Advisor for the Business Development Committee of the IEEE Computer Society. He is the co-founder for the Technology Advisory Board at Yintech Investment Holdings Limited.

In 2018, he was invited to be a founding member of IPSoft's AI Pioneers Steering Committee and he was also invited to join the Science and Technology Council for the ARCH Mission Foundation. Aside from taking on these new roles, he was invited to be a keynote speaker at the Yonder25 Conference as well as the Reshaping National Security forum which was hosted by Shanghai Institute for International Studies; and the UNICRI Centre for AI and Robotics.

Ibaraki has been the recipient of a Microsoft MVP award for 13 years in a row since 2006

In December 2018, Ibaraki was invited by YPO to share his insights about business and investments with respect to the Fourth Industrial Revolution at YPO Edge 2019.
