= Chaesub Lee =

Korean telecommunication executive

- 이재섭
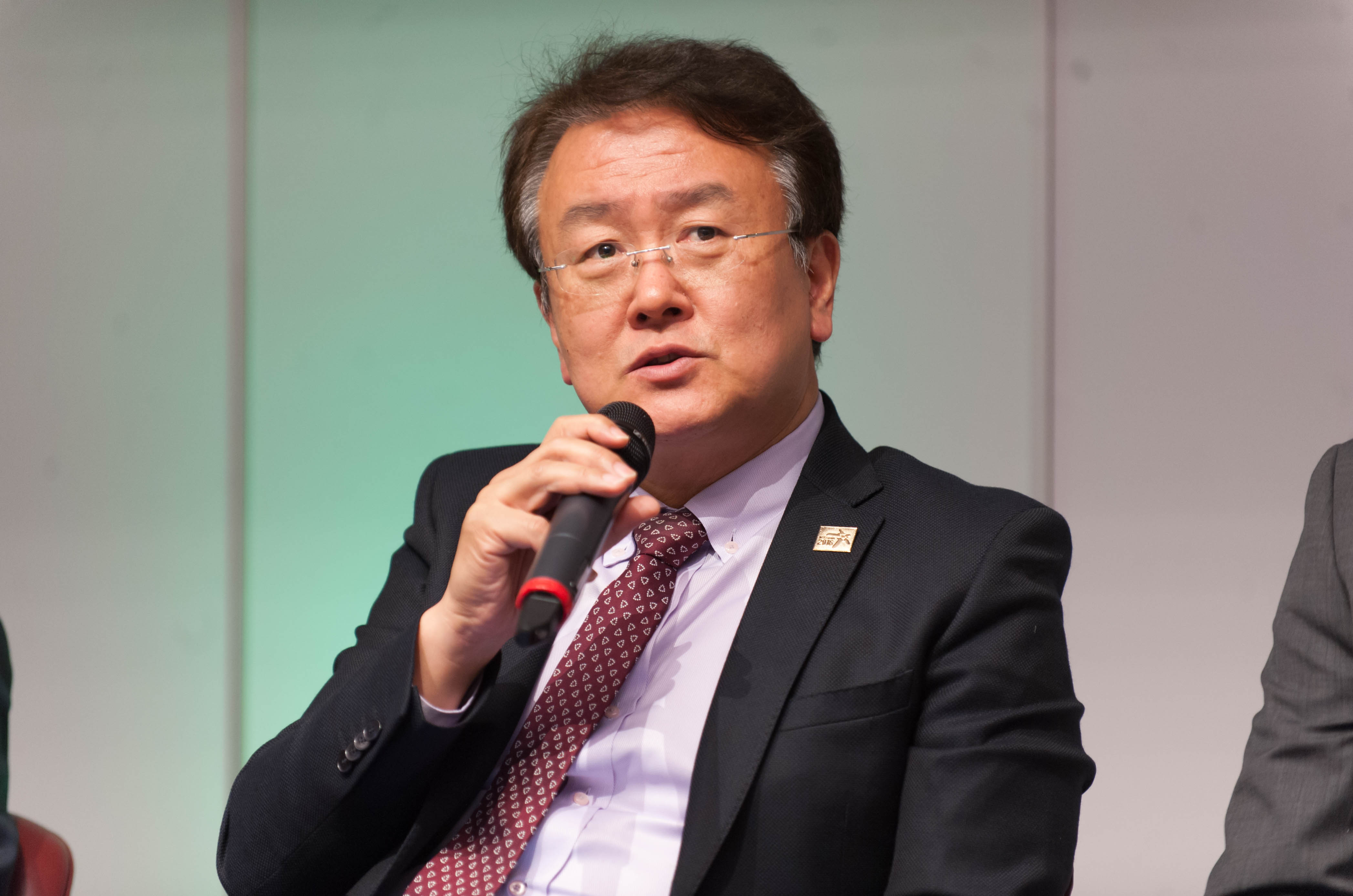

Director Telecommunication Standardization Bureau (ITU-T)
- In office 1 January 2015 – 31 December 2022
- Deputy: Reinhard Scholl

Chaesub Lee PhD (Korean: 이재섭) is a telecommunication executive who served as the Director of ITU Telecommunication Standardization Bureau, the permanent secretariat of the International Telecommunication Union Telecommunication Standardization Sector (ITU-T) from 2015 until 2022.

== Early career ==
In 1986 Lee started working at Korea Telecom, where he worked for 17 years. Following this, Lee worked at Korea's Electronics and Telecommunications Research Institute (ETRI) for eight years.

== ITU involvement ==
Lee was the Chairman of the ITU-T Focus Group Next-Generation Networks (FG-NGN), as well as the Vice-Chairman of the ITU-T Focus Group IPTV.

Lee served as Vice-Chairman of ITU-T Study Group 13 "Future Networks and Cloud" (SG13) from 2001 until 2008, after which he became Chairman of that group in 2009.

== Director Telecommunication Standardization Bureau ==
Lee was elected at the 2014 Plenipotentiary Conference in Busan (Republic of Korea), with the term beginning on January 1, 2015. At the 2018 ITU Plenipotentiary Conference in Dubai, Lee was elected to a second term. As Director, Lee oversees the Standardization work undertaken by the ITU-T Study Groups, such as ITU-T Study Group 13 on network standards, ITU-T Study Group 16 on multimedia standards, and ITU-T Study Group 17 on security standards, as well as the various Focus Groups, such as the ITU-WHO Focus Group on Artificial Intelligence for Health and the Focus Group on Machine Learning for 5G, which developed Y.3172.
