= National Center for Telehealth & Technology =

The National Center for Telehealth & Technology (T2) is one of the Defense Centers of Excellence for Psychological Health and Traumatic Brain Injury (DCoE), a part of the Military Health System (MHS). T2 was originally established to lead the integration of behavioural sciences with technology to provide solutions for psychological health and traumatic brain injury (TBI). T2 is a principal coordinator of United States Department of Defense (DoD) initiatives involving telehealth, online health tools, suicide surveillance and prevention, and information technology.

== History ==
T2 was established as a Department of Defense organization at Joint Base Lewis-McChord in 2008. It was developed out of the Army Behavioral Health Technology Office at Madigan Army Medical Center.

== Overview ==
T2 is staffed by clinical psychologists, researchers, technical specialists, project managers, and communication experts who develop assessment, screening, reference, and treatment tools for the military community. The organization is tasked with identifying, developing treatments for, and minimize or eliminate the short-term and long-term adverse effects of TBI and deployment-related psychological health issues.

T2’s key objectives include:

- Serving as a primary DoD resource for integrating behavioral sciences with technology in health care and TBI care.
- Deploying technological strategies to provide care in remote or underserved areas.
- Leveraging innovative technologies to help reduce stigma that can deter service members, veterans, and military families from seeking care.
- Developing telehealth standards, processes, and review mechanisms.
- Coordinating services with other DoD, Department of Veterans Affairs, and civilian organizations.
- Researching and validating technological applications for psychological health and TBI care.

== Organization ==
T2 is headquartered at Joint Base Lewis-McChord near Tacoma, Washington and has an office in Crystal City, Virginia. T2 is organized into six distinct but collaborative divisions:

=== Telehealth Program (THP) ===
THP applies communication solutions known as telemental health, such as video teleconferencing and mobile video calling, to deliver mental health services to military personnel in physically remote locations. Principal THP projects include the Integrated Mental Health Strategy (IMHS), deployable telehealth centers, and the Telemental Health Training Program.

=== Innovative Technology Applications (ITA) ===
ITA develops virtual reality, virtual world, and augmented reality programs designed to improve psychological health and wellness. Its principal projects focus on treating post-traumatic stress disorder (PTSD) and include the Virtual PTSD Experience in Second Life and Virtual Reality Exposure Therapy (VRET) for PTSD. ITA also tests and validates T2 products through the usability lab of its Technology Enhancement Center (TEC).

=== Operations (Ops) ===
Responsible for the daily operations of T2, the Ops division provides general administration, human resources, finance, logistics, and public affairs.

=== Population & Prevention Programs (P3) ===
P3 develops online and mobile applications providing self-service support products to end users (service members, veterans, and military families) and diagnostic and clinical resources to health care providers. P3's Web-based applications include AfterDeployment.org, MilitaryKidsConnect.org, and SuicideOutreach.org and mobile applications for iOS and Android include Breathe2Relax, PTSD Coach, Tactical Breather, and T2 MoodTracker.

=== Research, Outcomes, Surveillance, and Evaluation (ROSE) ===
ROSE develops and conducts testing and evaluation routines for all T2 applications and programs prior to their release for general use. ROSE conducts a comprehensive ongoing suicide surveillance program for the DoD and disseminates the data annually. Principle projects include DoD Suicide Event Report (DoDSER), Personal Technology (PTEC) Study, Web-Based Care Survey, and Stigma Survey.

=== Technology Systems (TS) ===
TS is the technology development component of T2 and is responsible for the building, testing and deployment of software-based and systems-based solutions.
