= Connected health =

Healthcare management model

Connected health is a socio-technical model for healthcare management and delivery by using technology to provide healthcare services remotely. Connected health, also known as technology enabled care (TEC) aims to maximize healthcare resources and provide increased, flexible opportunities for consumers to engage with clinicians and better self-manage their care. It uses readily available consumer technologies to deliver patient care outside of the hospital or doctor's office. Connected health encompasses programs in telehealth, remote care (such as home care and remote patient monitoring), and disease and lifestyle management. It often leverages existing technologies, such as connected devices using cellular networks, and is associated with efforts to improve chronic care. However, there is an increasing blur between software capabilities and healthcare needs whereby technologists are now providing the solutions to support consumer wellness and provide the connectivity between patient data, information and decisions. This calls for new techniques to guide Connected Health solutions such as "design thinking" to support software developers in clearly identifying healthcare requirements, and extend and enrich traditional software requirements gathering techniques.

The United States and European Union are two dominant markets for the use of connected health in home care service, in part due to the high availability of telephone and Internet service as compared to other parts of the world. Proponents of connected health believe that technology can transform healthcare delivery and address inefficiencies especially in the area of work flow management, chronic disease management and patient compliance of the US and global healthcare systems.

== History ==
Connected health has its roots in telemedicine, and its more recent relative, telehealth. The first telemedicine programs were primarily undertaken to address healthcare access and/or provider shortages. Connected health is distinguished from telemedicine by:

- A broader concern for healthcare cost, quality and efficiency, particularly as related to the chronically ill
- Concomitant interests in making healthcare more patient centric by promoting healthcare consumerism through education, and patient feedback
- Efforts in the direction of integrating data generated outside of traditional healthcare settings such as the home with centralised, often electronic patient record

Connected health is the "umbrella term arrived to lessen the confusion over the definitions of telemedicine, telehealth and mhealth". It is considered as the new lexicon for the term telemedicine. The technology view of connected health focuses more on the connection methods between clients and the health care professional.

An alternative view is that of a socio-technical perspective in which connected health is considered as a combination of people, processes and technology. In 2015 Connected health was defined as patient-centred care resulting from process-driven health care delivery undertaken by health care professionals, patients and/or carer who are supported by the use of technology (software and/or hardware).

== In operation ==
Two "core platforms" are emphasized in connected health, self-care and remote care, with programs primarily focused on monitoring and feedback for the chronically ill, elderly, and those patients located at an untenable distance from primary or specialty providers. Programs designed to improve patient-provider communication within an individual medical practice for example, the use of email to communicate with patients between office visits also fall within the purview of connected health. There are also lifestyle coaching programs, in which an individual receives healthcare information to facilitate behavior change to improve their fitness and/or general well being, (see wellness) or to reduce or eliminate the impact of a particular behavior that presents a risk to their health status. Some of the most common types of connected health programs in operation today include:

- Home care via remote monitoring of chronically ill patients including surveillance connected devices or patient controlled monitoring of health parameters
- Traditional telehealth programs, where care is provided in remote areas by teams of local clinicians or community healthcare workers teamed up with specialists in medical centers
- Monitoring programs whose aim is to ensure the safety and quality of life of elderly parents living at a distance from their relatives
- Web-based second opinion services for patients in need of medical care
- Lifestyle and fitness coaching for wellness or health risk reduction

The Center for Connected Health is implementing a range of programs in high-risk, chronic and remotely located populations.

Inherent in the concept of connected health is flexibility in terms of technological approaches to care delivery and specific program objectives. For instance, remote monitoring programs might use a combination of cell phone and smart phone technology, online communications or biosensors and may aim to increase patient-provider communication, involve patients in their care through regular feedback, or improve upon a health outcome measure in a defined patient population or individual. Digital pen technology, global positioning, videoconferencing and environmental sensors are all playing a role in connected health.

== Goals ==
Proponents of Connected health view it as a critical component of change in human healthcare and envision:

- Reductions in the cost of providing quality care to the chronically ill, estimated by the Center for Health Care Economics at the Milken Institute to be over $1 trillion per year
- Improved global and local public health surveillance, with a resultant reduction in epidemics, increased control over infectious disease and improved drug safety
- Diminished rate of medical errors
- Better "customer service" in healthcare
- Ongoing preventive health, with attendant reductions in: morbidity, mortality and the cost of care
- Consumer engagement in health and self-management
- Safer and more effective clinical trials

== Evolution ==
Rising costs, increases in chronic diseases, geographic dispersion of families, growing provider shortages, ethnic disparities in care, better survival rates among patients fighting serious diseases, an aging U.S. population and longer lifespan are all factors pointing to a need for better ways of delivering healthcare.

Direct-to-consumer advertising is a demonstrated contributor to the rise in consumer demand, as is the mass availability of inexpensive technology and ubiquity of the Internet, cell phones and PDAs. Connected health experts such as Joseph C. Kvedar, believe that consumer engagement in healthcare is on its way to becoming a major force for change.

In summary, connected health has arisen from: 1) a desire on the part of individual physicians and healthcare organizations to provide better access, quality and efficiency of care 2) dynamics of the healthcare economy (such as rising costs and changing demographics) 3) consumerism in health care and a drive towards patient centric healthcare. Together, these factors are providing impetus for connected healthcare in the United States and many other industrialised nations and forcing innovation both from within and outside the system.

== Evidence ==
While connected health is yet emerging, there is evidence of its benefit. For example, in a program being implemented by the Center for Connected Health and Partners Home Care, over 500 heart failure patients have now been monitored remotely through the collection of vital signs, including heart rate, blood pressure and weight, using simple devices in the patient's home. The information is sent daily to a home health nurse, who can identify early warning signs, notify the patient's primary care physician, and intervene to avert potential health crises. A pilot of this program demonstrated reduced hospitalizations. Another initiative at the Center for Connected Health uses cellular telephone technology and a "smart" pill bottle to detect when a patient has not taken their scheduled medication. A signal is then sent that lights up an ambient orb device in the patient's home to remind them to take their medication.

== Funding and implementation ==
It appears that connected health programs are operated and funded primarily by home care agencies and large healthcare systems. However, insurers and employers are increasingly interested in connected health for its potential to reduce direct and indirect healthcare costs. In 2007, EMC Corporation launched the first employer-sponsored connected health program, in the beta phase of implementation, aimed at improving outcomes and cost of care for patients with high blood pressure.

== US government agencies ==
Government agencies involved in connected health include:

- The Office for the Advancement of Telehealth
- The National Center for Telehealth & Technology (T2)
- The Centers for Medicare & Medicaid Services (CMS), to the extent that Medicaid reimburses for telemedicine programs, at the state's option. According to the CMS Web site, at least 18 states are allowing reimbursement for services provided via telemedicine for reasons that include improved access to specialists for rural communities and reduced transportation costs.
- The Office of the National Coordinator for Health Information Technology (ONC) is charged with creating an interoperable health information technology infrastructure for the nation, primarily defined as an electronic health records system. Former National Coordinator David Brailer indicated his support for portable personal health records which are controlled by consumers. As of 2006 it remained to be seen how his successor, Robert Kolodner, will interpret this charge.

== Personal health records ==
Personal health records, or PHRS, (see personal health record) – are essentially medical records controlled and maintained by the healthcare consumer. PHRs intersect with connected health in that they attempt to increase the involvement of healthcare consumers in their care. By contrast, electronic medical records (EMRs) (see electronic medical record) are digital medical records or medical records systems maintained by hospitals or medical practices and are not part of connected health delivery.
