= ISO/IEEE 11073 =

Standard on communication between medical devices and external computer systems

CEN ISO/IEEE 11073 Health informatics - Medical / health device communication standards enable communication between medical, health care and wellness devices and external computer systems. They provide automatic and detailed electronic data capture of client-related and vital signs information, and of device operational data.

== Background ==
=== Goals ===
1. Real-time plug-and-play interoperability for citizen-related medical, healthcare and wellness devices;
2. Efficient exchange of care device data, acquired at the point-of-care, in all care environments.

- "Real-time" means that data from multiple devices can be retrieved, time correlated, and displayed or processed in fractions of a second.
- "Plug-and-play" means that all a user has to do is make the connection – the systems automatically detect, configure, and communicate without any other human interaction
- "Efficient exchange of care device data" means that information that is captured at the point-of-care (e.g., personal vital signs data) can be archived, retrieved, and processed by many different types of applications without extensive software and equipment support, and without needless loss of information.

The standards are targeted at both point-of-care devices (ventilators, infusion pumps, ECG, etc.) and personal health and fitness devices (such as glucose monitors, pulse oximeters, weighing scales, medication dispensers and activity monitors) and at continuing and acute care devices (such as pulse oximeters, ventilators and infusion pumps). They comprise a family of standards that can be layered together to provide connectivity optimized for the specific devices being interfaced. There are four main partitions to the standards:

- Device data, including a nomenclature, or terminology, optimized for vital signs information representation based on an object-oriented data model, and device specialisations;
- General application services (e.g., polled vs. "event driven" services);
- Internetworking and gateway standards (e.g., an observation reporting interface from CEN ISO/IEEE 11073-based messaging and data representation to HL7 or DICOM);
- Transports (e.g., cable connected or wireless).

=== Problems ===
- In the absence of standards for these devices, (a) data is captured either manually or at considerable expense (using specialized equipment), or (b) it is not captured at all, which is most often the case.
- Manually captured data is labour-intensive, recorded infrequently (e.g., written down hourly by a nurse clinician), and prone to human error.
- Use of expensive custom connectivity equipment (a) drives up the cost of care delivery; (b) is only used for patients with the highest acuity; and (c) tends to lock care providers into single companies or partnerships that provide "complete" information system solutions, making it difficult to choose best-of-breed technologies to meet client needs, or the most cost effective systems.
- Development and deployment of advanced care delivery systems are hindered. For example, systems that collect real-time data from multiple devices and use the information to detect safety problems (e.g., adverse drug events), or to quickly determine a client's condition and automatically, or with minimal carer involvement, optimally adjust a device's operation (e.g., for insulin delivery based on glucose level information) cannot operate without these standards.
- With no standardisation in this area, even when similar devices do provide communications, there is no consistency in the information and services that are provided, thus inhibiting the development of advanced care delivery systems or even consistent health records.

In short: appropriate use of 11073 device communication standards can help deliver better health, fitness and care, more quickly, safely, and at a lower cost.

=== Motivation ===
- These are the only standards addressing this area of connectivity.
- They provide a complete solution for medical device connectivity, starting at the physical cable or wireless connection up through the abstract representation of information and the services used for its management and exchange.
- They can enable full disclosure of device-mediated information. So measurement modalities be declared in detail and the associated metrics & alerts communicated, together with any user-made changes to settings. In addition, the device can communicate its manufacturer, model, serial number, configuration, operating status and network location – all in real time if required.
- The IEEE 11073 standards have been developed with a high level of international participation. They have been, and continue to be, adopted as International Organization for Standardization (ISO) standards through ISO TC215 Health Informatics and as European standards through the European Committee for Standardization (CEN) TC251 Health Informatics, specifically as the CEN ISO/IEEE 11073 series. The end result is a single set of internationally harmonized standards that have been developed and adopted by ISO and CEN member countries.
- These CEN ISO/IEEE 11073 standards have been developed in close coordination with other standards development organisations, including IEEE 802, IHTSDO, IrDA, HL7, DICOM, and CLSI.
- Memoranda of Understanding with IHE, IHTSDO, and HL7; and (through ISO) close liaison with Continua Health Alliance assist still wider integration.
- The CEN ISO/IEEE 11073 nomenclature is now being used to populate, and to establish equivalence, within SNOMED CT - the most widely used clinical terminology.
- A liaison between the IEEE 11073 standards group and the USA Food and Drug Administration (FDA) Center for Devices and Radiological Health (CDRH) in the USA helps ensure that patient safety and efficacy concerns are fully addressed in the standards.
- The Continua Health Alliance and the English NHS National Programme for Information Technology (NPfIT) both specify use of the standards for device communication.
- The standards have been included in the USA National Committee on Vital and Health Statistics recommendations to the Department of Health and Human Services related to patient medical record information message formats supporting Health Insurance Portability and Accountability Act (HIPAA) compliant implementations.
- The cost of integrating innovative technologies into established product lines is reduced — and a barrier to new companies is lowered.

=== Availability ===
11073 standards are available freely to those actively involved in their development, others may purchase them. For published and draft standards search for '11073' at: IEEE, ISO or CEN. Standards may be purchased from the national standards organisation or bookstore (e.g. AFNOR, BSI, DIN, JIS, UNI, etc.).

== Overview ==
The ISO/IEEE 11073 Medical / Health Device Communication Standards are a family of ISO, IEEE, and CEN joint standards addressing the interoperability of medical devices. The ISO/IEEE 11073 standard family defines parts of a system, with which it is possible, to exchange and evaluate vital signs data between different medical devices, as well as remote control these devices.

=== Point-of-care medical device ===
11073-00101	Health informatics – PoC medical device communication – Part 00101: Guide – Guidelines for the use of RF wireless technology
11073-10101:2004(E)	Health informatics – Point-of-care medical device communication – Part 10101: Nomenclature
11073-10101a:2015(E)	Health informatics – Point-of-care medical device communication – Part 10101: Nomenclature Amendment 1: Additional Definitions
11073-10102:2014(E)	Health informatics – Point-of-care medical device communication – Part 10102: Nomenclature – Annotated ECG
11073-10103:2012(E)	Health informatics – Point-of-care medical device communication – Part 10103: Nomenclature – Implantable device, cardiac
11073-10201:2004(E)	Health informatics – Point-of-care medical device communication – Part 10201: Domain information model
11073-10207:2017	Health informatics – Point-of-care medical device communication – Part 10207: Domain Information and Service Model for Service-Oriented Point-of-Care Medical Device Communication
11073-20101:2004(E)	Health informatics – Point-of-care medical device communication – Part 20101: Application profile – Base standard
11073-20701:2018	Health informatics – Point-of-care medical device communication – Part 20701: Service-Oriented Medical Device Exchange Architecture and Protocol Binding
11073-20702:2016	Health informatics – Point-of-care medical device communication – Part 20702: Medical Devices Communication Profile for Web Services
11073-30200a:2011(E)	Health informatics – Point-of-care medical device communication – Part 30200: Transport profile – Cable connected (amended)
11073-30300:2004(E)	Health informatics – Point-of-care medical device communication – Part 30300: Transport profile – Infrared wireless
11073-30400:2012(E)	Health informatics – Point-of-care medical device communication – Part 30400: Transport profile – Cabled Ethernet
11073-90101:2008(E)	Health informatics – Point-of-care medical device communication – Part 90101: Analytical instruments – Point-of-care test

The 'core' standards are: 11073-10101, 11073-10201, 11073-20101 and 11073-30200

=== Personal health device ===
ISO/IEEE 11073 personal health device (PHD) standards are a group of standards addressing the interoperability of personal health devices (PHDs) such as weighing scales, blood pressure monitors, blood glucose monitors and the like. The standards draw upon earlier IEEE11073 standards work, but differ from this earlier work due to an emphasis on devices for personal use (rather than hospital use) and a simpler communications model.

These are described in more detail at ISO/IEEE 11073 Personal Health Data (PHD) Standards

== Core standard ==
=== Nomenclature ===
Within this standard nomenclature codes are defined, these give the possibility to clearly identify objects and attributes in relation to the so-called OID-Code. The nomenclature is divided in partitions, to demarcate codes with regards to content and functions. Programmatically these codes are defined as constants, those can be used by a pseudonym.
example in C:

#define MDC_PART_OBJ 1
/* Definition for the Partition Object Infrastructure */
#define MDC_MOC_VMS_MDS_SIMP 37
/* Define the Object Simple Medical Device System */

=== Domain information model ===
This standard is the "heart" of VITAL. Within this, objects and their arrangement in a Domain Information Model for vital signs data transmission are defined. Beyond this the standard defines a service model for the standardized communication.

=== Base standard ===
The common background for assembly and transmission of objects and their attributes are defined in this standard. It's subdivided in a communication model and an information model. The communication model describes the layers 5 to 7 of the OSI 7-layer model. The information model defines the modeling, formatting and the syntax for transmission coding of the objects.

== Agent/manager principle ==
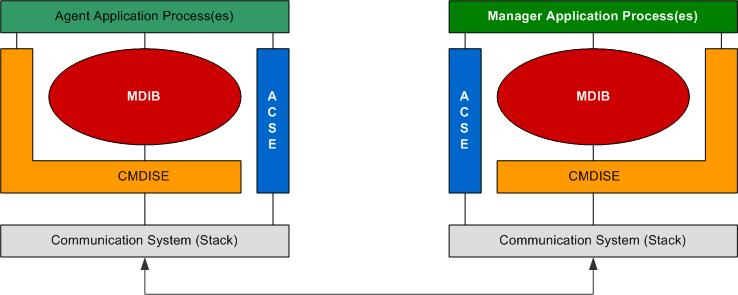
Agents and managers in ISO/IEEE 11073

All defined parts of this standard family are designed to allow communication according to this principle. The arrangement of two or more medical devices as a system, so that the components are possible to understand and to interact, are the basic idea of this principle.

The agent is the part of the principle that is connected to the medical devices. It provides the data. The manager keeps a copy of the agent data, reacts on update events from them, and triggers events on the agent. In most use cases the manager is only used to remotely monitor and display agent data, but in some cases it may also remotely control the agents. Agents and manager are built in the same structure. This enables an agent to act as a manager and reverse. Besides the plain agent-manager application, hybrid systems over multiple stages are possible.

=== Agent application process(es) ===
This module is the interface between a proprietary (eventually native) protocol and the ISO/IEEE (VITAL) object world. It is not defined within the standard and as a result it can be implemented free.

=== Medical data information base ===
MMOs (Managed Medical Objects) are stored hierarchically within a tree structure in a form named Domain Information Model (DIM). This MMOs and their arrangement in the DIM are defined within this standard. The implementation of the MDIB (Medical Data Information Base) and their functionality is out of the scope of the standard.

=== Association service control element ===
This module is subject to the standards ISO/IEC 15953 and ISO/IEC 15954. It has services available, that controlling the association assembly and disassembly. A possible association and their condition is negotiated here, no MMOs are transmitted over this module.

An element of the application layer, which is responsible for the establishment, termination and control of associations between two or more communication parties (programs).

=== Common medical device information service element ===
Services for the data exchange of MMOs (Managed Medical Objects) between Agent-Manager systems, are defined in this module. This data exchange is highly dynamic. Objects are created, changed or deleted by services named CREATE, UPDATE, DELETE. Through reports, which can be defined detailed down to the single object attribute, it is possible to trigger complex operations in Agent or Manager, through this services.

=== Presentation layer ===
This layer contains the encoding of object data. Objects, groups of objects attributes or single attributes are encoded by ASN.1 representations, respectively the specialization MDER (Medical Device encoding Rules).

=== Session layer ===
That layer controls connection at the session level.

== Domain information model ==
The central core of the standard is the so-called Domain Information Model. Objects containing vital-sign data representations and their relationships are defined in this model. Objects for additional services around vital signs data objects, are defined also here.

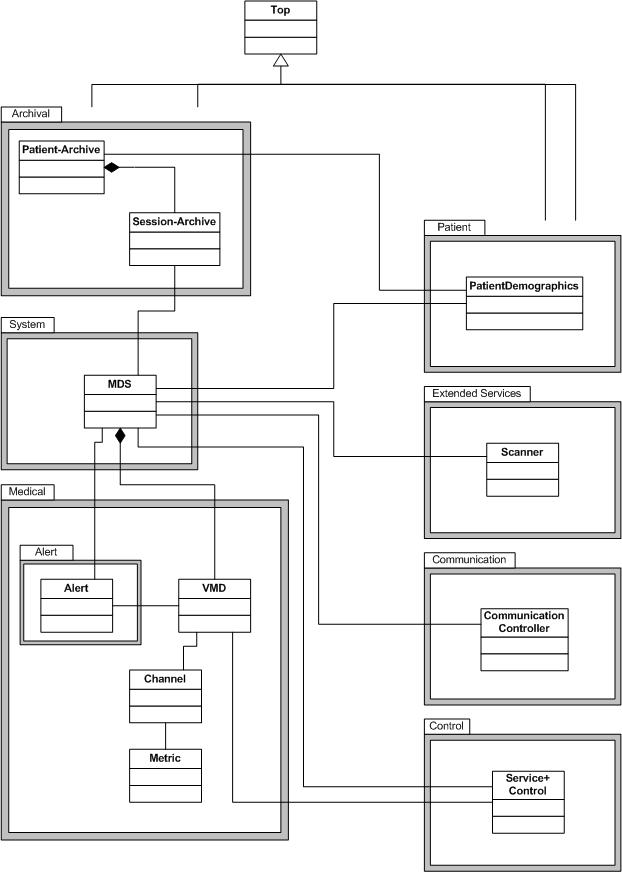

For content sensitive classification of the objects, they are divided into packages.

=== Medical package ===
The package that defines objects, to map medical vital signs data. There are different objects to store vital signs data in different ways. As an example the RealTimeSampleArray object for the management of e.g. ECG data be mentioned.

=== Alert package ===
This small package is related within the medical package. It is used for setting and administrating alert parameters to objects from the medical package.

=== System package ===
A representation of a medical device can be achieved with objects of this package. It contains concrete derivations of the abstract MDS (MedicalDevice System) object. One of these concrete derivations are ever the root object of a DIM tree. The Battery object and the Clock object are further objects in this package. The last one can be used for time synchronization of medical device data.

=== Control package ===
Inside the control package, objects for the remote control of a medical device are defined. There are objects used for influencing the modality of measuring (for example the SetRangeOperation object) and objects for direct remote control of medical devices (for example the ActivateOperation object).

=== Extended services package ===
Other than the name supposes, in this package essential and ever-used objects are defined. This package is built on so-called scanner objects in different derivations. Scanning data in other objects and generation of event reports, which can be sent, is the sense of these objects. The scanner objects have a wide range of different attributes (e.g. scan interval, scan lists, scan period etc.), for a wide range of applications of the DIM. As an example, the FastPeriCfgScanner object (Fast Periodic Configurable Scanner) is specially constructed for the requirements of real-time data exchange in conjunction with the RealTimeSampleArray object to transmit live data from ECG devices.

=== Communication package ===
The objects in these package contain information, which are responsible for basic communication profiles. These packages are developed very open, so that different communication profiles and interfaces to proprietary device interfaces can be built. Annotation by the author: From a historic view, the standard was developed for the first time in the early 90s, this package has to be reconstructed.

=== Archival package ===
Storing Patient related data in online or offline archives is the idea for objects in the archival package. For Example, the Patient Archive object can store vital signs data, demographic data and treatment data in one object.

=== Patient package ===
The patient package contains only one object, the Patient Demographics object. This object contains patient related data and can be set in relationship to an MDS object or one of the objects from the archive package, to give anonymous data the reference to patient data.

== Communication model ==
The complete communication sequence can be very complex. This article should provide basic information, that can be described in more detail at a later time in a separate article.

=== Finite-state machine ===
The finite-state machine regulates the synchronization of an Agent Manager system over different conditions. A complete session roundtrip starts up with the disconnected state, is transferred by multiple stages to the initialized state, in what the actual data transfer shall be done, and ends with the disconnected state.

=== Initializing MDIB ===
During the association phase, the configuring state will be reached. In this condition Agent and Manager are to exchange object data for the first time. In the process a MDSCreateEvent in the form of a report would be triggered. This report creates a copy of the MDS root object from the Agent MDIB in the Manager MDIB. Afterward a Contextscanner object is created in the Agent MDIB. This scanner object scans the complete MDIB and generates a report containing the complete Agent MDIB representation, except the MDS root object. The Manager evaluates this report and creates the objects defined here in his own MDIB copy. At this point the manager has an exact copy of the Agent MDIB. Both are now at configured state.

=== Data exchange through services ===
The Common Medical Device Information Service Element (CMDISE) provides a GET service, to deliver data requested by the Manager. The Agent GET service retrieves a list of attribute IDs. These IDs identify explicit values within Agents MDIB. Now the Agent creates a report, containing the requested values. This report is sent back to the Manager.

=== Data exchange through scanner objects ===
In an MDIB, additional objects shall be created through the CREATE service of CMDISE. The Manager requests the Agent through this service to create a scanner object itself, and to fix the scanner object on one or more values. Optional for example the scan interval for the data delivery can be set. The Agent creates the scanner object in his own MDIB and sends the Manager a response message. Now the Manager creates a copy of the scanner object in his MDIB. The data updates from Agent to Manager now occur automatically through the scanner object. Through CMDISE's DELETE service, the scanner object can be deleted, like all other MDIB objects.

== See also ==
- H.810
