= ITU-WHO Focus Group on Artificial Intelligence for Health =

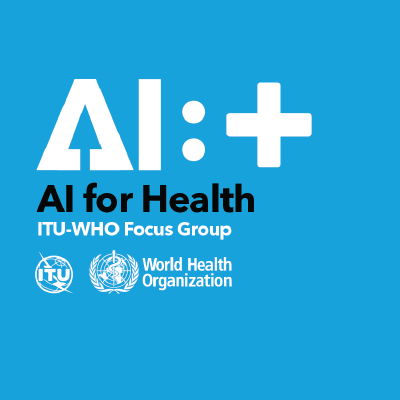
- ITU-WHO Focus Group on Artificial Intelligence for Health
- Abbreviation: AI for Health
- Formation: 2018
- Type: Standards organization
- Purpose: Benchmarking framework for AI in health diagnostic aids
- Location: Geneva, Switzerland
- Region served: Worldwide
- Chairman: Thomas Wiegand
- Vice-Chairman: Stephen Ibaraki
- Secretariat: Simao Campos, Bastiaan Quast
- Parent organization: ITU-T Study Group 16
- Subsidiaries: Working Groups and Topic Groups
- Affiliations: ITU-T, World Health Organization
- Website: www.itu.int/go/fgai4h/

The ITU-WHO Focus Group on Artificial Intelligence for Health (AI for Health) was an inter-agency collaboration from 2018 between the World Health Organization and the ITU, which in 2019 created a benchmarking framework to assess the accuracy of AI in health.

The organization convened an international network of experts and stakeholders from fields like research, practice, regulation, ethics, public health, etc, that developed guideline documentation and code. The documents have addressed ethics, assessment/evaluation, handling, and regulation of AI for health solutions, covering specific use cases including AI in ophthalmology, histopathology, dentistry, malaria detection, radiology, symptom checker applications, etc. FG-AI4H has established an ad hoc group concerned with digital technologies for health emergencies, including COVID-19. All documentation is public.

The idea for the Focus Group came out of the Health Track of the 2018 AI for Good Global Summit. Administratively, FG-AI4H was created by ITU-T Study Group 16. Under ITU-T's framework, participation in Focus Groups is open to anyone from an ITU Member State. The secretariat is provided by the Telecommunication Standardization Bureau (under Director Chaesub Lee). It was first created at the July 2018 meeting with a lifetime of two years, at the July 2020 meeting, this was extended for another two years, where the focus group also submitted its deliverables to its parent body. It was also presented at the NeurIPS 2020 health workshop. In July 2023 "the work was grandfathered in the Global Initiative on AI for Health (GI-AI4H)".

== AI for Health Framework ==
The outline of the benchmarking framework was published in a 2019 commentary in The Lancet.

The output of the Focus Group AI for Health were structured in the AI for Health Framework. Depending on their primary domain being health or ICT, the individual components of the AI for Health Framework were ratified by the corresponding United Nations Specialized Agency, as WHO Guidelines and ITU Recommendations respectively.

Standards drawn up by FG-AI4H were titled as:

1. AI4H ethics considerations
2. AI4H regulatory [best practices | considerations]
3. AI4H requirements specification
4. AI software life cycle specification
5. Data specification
6. AI training best practices specification
7. AI4H evaluation considerations
8. AI4H scale-up and adoption
9. AI4H applications and platforms
10. Use cases of the ITU-WHO Focus Group on AI for Health

== See also ==
- World Health Organization (WHO)
- ITU Telecommunication Standardization Sector
- Artificial intelligence in healthcare
- Digital health
- Artificial Intelligence
- Machine Learning
