= World Telecommunication Standardization Assembly =

International 4-yearly conference

WTSA-24
- Date: 15 October 2024– 24 October 2024
- Location: New Delhi, India
- Participants: Member states of the International Telecommunication Union
- Related event: Global Standards Symposium
- Website: https://wtsa.itu.int

The World Telecommunication Standardization Assembly (WTSA) is the governing conference of the ITU Standardization Sector (ITU-T), one of the three world conferences of the International Telecommunication Union, and as such, the United Nations system. The quadrennial conference decides the working methods for ITU-T for the next Study Period. It also creates the Telecommunication Standardization Advisory Group (TSAG) and the ITU-T Study Groups (such as ITU-T Study Group 13) and elects their management teams. The Recommendations and resolutions that are approved at WTSA shape the future of ICT standardization.

== WTSA-24 ==
WTSA-24 took place from 15 to 24 October 2024 in New Delhi, India.

== WTSA-20 ==
WTSA-20 was scheduled to be held in Hyderabad, India in 17-27 November 2020. It was rescheduled to 1-9 March 2022 at CICG, next to ITU headquarters in Geneva, Switzerland, due to the COVID-19 pandemic.

== WTSA-16 ==
WTSA-16 was held from 25 October until 3 November 2016 in Hammamet, Tunisia.

== WTSA-12 ==
WTSA-12 was held in Dubai, United Arab Emirates from 20 to 29 November 2012.

== WTSA-08 ==
WTSA-08 was held from 21 to 30 October 2008 in Johannesburg, South Africa.

== WTSA-04 ==
WTSA-04 was held in Florianópolis, Brazil from 5 to 14 October 2004.

== WTSA-2000 ==
WTSA-2000 was held from 27 September to 6 October 2000 in Montréal, Canada.
