= ITU-T =

Standardization Sector of the International Telecommunication Union

International Telecommunication Union Telecommunication Standardization Sector
- Abbreviation: ITU-T / UIT-T
- Type: ITU sector
- Legal status: Active
- Headquarters: Geneva, Switzerland
- Director: Seizo Onoe
- Parent organization: International Telecommunication Union
- Website: ITU.int/ITU-T

The International Telecommunication Union Telecommunication Standardization Sector (ITU-T) (Note: Until 1992 known as the CCITT, in French: Comité Consultatif International Téléphonique et Télégraphique) is one of the three sectors (branches) of the International Telecommunication Union (ITU). It is responsible for coordinating standards for telecommunications and Information Communication Technology, such as X.509 for cybersecurity, Y.3172 and Y.3173 for machine learning, and H.264/MPEG-4 AVC for video compression, between its Member States, Private Sector Members, and Academia Members.

The World Telecommunication Standardization Assembly (WTSA), the sector's governing conference, convenes every four years.

ITU-T has a permanent secretariat called the Telecommunication Standardization Bureau (TSB), which is based at the ITU headquarters in Geneva, Switzerland. The current director of the TSB is Seizo Onoe (of Japan), whose 4-year term commenced on 1 January 2023. Seizo Onoe succeeded Chaesub Lee of South Korea, who was director from 1 January 2015 until 31 December 2022.

== Primary function ==
The ITU-T mission is to ensure the efficient and timely production of standards covering all fields of telecommunications and Information Communication Technology (ICTs) on a worldwide basis, as well as defining tariff and accounting principles for international telecommunication services.

The international standards that are produced by the ITU-T are referred to as "Recommendations" as they become mandatory only when adopted as part of a national law.

Since the ITU-T is part of the ITU, which is a United Nations specialized agency, its standards carry more formal international weight than those of most other standards-development organizations that publish technical specifications of a similar form.

== History ==
At the initiative of Napoleon III, the French government invited international participants to a conference in Paris in 1865 to facilitate and regulate international telegraph services. A result of the conference was the founding of the forerunner of the modern ITU.

At the 1924 Paris conference, the ITU created a consultative committee to deal with the complexities of the international telephone services, known as CCIF and sometimes just as CCI (Comité Consultatif International Téléphonique à grande distance) and in 1926 in Berlin a consultative committee to deal with the complexities of the international long-distance telegraphy CCIT (Comité Consultatif International des Comité consultatif international télégraphique à grande distance) was created. In 1927 a consultative committee for radio communication was added, the CCIR (Comité Consultatif International des Radiocommunications à grande distance).

In view of the basic similarity of many of the technical problems faced by the CCIF and CCIT, a decision was taken in 1956 to merge the CCIF and CCIT into a single entity, the International Telegraph and Telephone Consultative Committee (CCITT, in French: Comité Consultatif International Téléphonique et Télégraphique). The first Plenary Assembly of the new organization was held in Geneva, Switzerland in December 1956.

In 1992, the Plenipotentiary Conference (the top policy-making conference of ITU) saw a reform of ITU, giving the Union greater flexibility to adapt to an increasingly complex, interactive and competitive environment. The CCITT was renamed the Telecommunication Standardization Sector (ITU-T), as one of three Sectors of the Union alongside the Radiocommunication Sector (ITU-R) and the Telecommunication Development Sector (ITU-D).

Historically, the Recommendations of the CCITT were presented at plenary assemblies for endorsement, held every four years, and the full set of Recommendations were published after each plenary assembly. However, the delays in producing texts, and translating them into other working languages, did not suit the fast pace of change in the telecommunications industry.

== "Real time" standardization ==
The rise of the personal computer industry in the early 1980s created a new common practice among both consumers and businesses of adopting "bleeding edge" communications technology even if it was not yet standardized. Thus, standards organizations had to put forth standards much faster, or find themselves ratifying de facto standards after the fact. One of the most prominent examples of this was the Open Document Architecture project, which began in 1985 when a profusion of software firms around the world were still furiously competing to shape the future of the electronic office, and was completed in 1999 long after Microsoft Office's then-secret binary file formats had become established as the global de facto standard.

The ITU-T now operates under much more streamlined processes. The time between an initial proposal of a draft document by a member company and the final approval of a full-status ITU-T Recommendation can now be as short as a few months (or less in some cases). This makes the standardization approval process in the ITU-T much more responsive to the needs of rapid technology development than in the ITU's historical past. New and updated Recommendations are published on an almost daily basis, and nearly all of the library of over 3,270 Recommendations is now free of charge online. (About 30 specifications jointly maintained by the ITU-T and ISO/IEC are not available for free to the public.)

ITU-T has moreover tried to facilitate cooperation between the various forums and standard-developing organizations (SDOs). This collaboration is necessary to avoid duplication of work and the consequent risk of conflicting standards in the market place.

In the work of standardization, ITU-T cooperates with other SDOs, e.g., the International Organization for Standardization (ISO) and the Internet Engineering Task Force (IETF).

=== Development of Recommendations ===
Most of the work of ITU-T is carried out by its Sector Members and Associates, while the Telecommunication Standardization Bureau (TSB) is the executive arm of ITU-T and coordinator for a number of workshops and seminars to progress existing work areas and explore new ones. The events cover a wide array of topics in the field of information and communication technologies (ICT) and attract high-ranking experts as speakers, and attendees from engineers to high-level management from all industry sectors.

The technical work, the development of Recommendations, of ITU-T is managed by Study Groups (SGs), such as Study Group 13 for network standards, Study Group 16 for multimedia standards, and Study Group 17 for security standards, which are created by the World Telecommunication Standardization Assembly (WTSA) which is held every four years. As part of the deliberations, WTSA has instructed ITU to hold the Global Standards Symposium, which unlike WTSA is open to public for participation. The people involved in these SGs are experts in telecommunications from all over the world. There are currently 11 SGs. Study groups meet face to face (or virtually under exceptional circumstances) according to a calendar issued by the TSB. SGs are augmented by Focus Groups (FGs), an instrument created by ITU-T, providing a way to quickly react to ICT standardization needs and allowing great flexibility in terms of participation and working methods. The key difference between SGs and FGs is that the latter have greater freedom to organize and finance themselves, and to involve non-members in their work, but they do not have the authority to approve Recommendations. Focus Groups can be created very quickly, are usually short-lived and can choose their own working methods, leadership, financing, and types of deliverables. Current Focus Groups include the ITU-WHO Focus Group on Artificial Intelligence for Health (FG-AI4H) as well as Machine Learning for 5G (which developed Y.3172), Quantum Information Technologies for Networks, and Artificial Intelligence for Assisted and Autonomous Driving.

=== Alternative Approval Process ===
The Alternative Approval Process (AAP) is a fast-track approval procedure that was developed to allow standards to be brought to market in the timeframe that industry now demands. The AAP is defined in ITU-T Recommendation A.8.

This dramatic overhaul of standards-making by streamlining approval procedures was implemented in 2001 and is estimated to have cut the time involved in this critical aspect of the standardization process by 80 to 90 percent. This means that an average standard that took around four years to approve and publish until the mid nineties, and two years until 1997, can now be approved in an average of two months, or as little as five weeks.

Besides streamlining the underlying procedures involved in the approval process, an important contributory factor to the use of AAP is electronic document handling. Once the approval process has begun the rest of the process can be completed electronically, in the vast majority of cases, with no further physical meetings.

The introduction of AAP also formalizes public/private partnership in the approval process by providing equal opportunities for both sector members and member states in the approval of technical standards.

A panel of SG experts drafts a proposal that is then forwarded at an SG meeting to the appropriate body which decides if it is sufficiently ready to be designated a draft text and thus gives its consent for further review at the next level.

After this Consent has been given, TSB announces the start of the AAP procedure by posting the draft text to the ITU-T website and calling for comments. This gives the opportunity for all members to review the text. This phase, called last call, is a four-week period in which comments can be submitted by member states and sector members.

If no comments other than editorial corrections are received, the Recommendation is considered approved since no issues were identified that might need any further work. However, if there are any comments, the SG chairman, in consultation with TSB, sets up a comment resolution process by the concerned experts. The revised text is then posted on the web for an additional review period of three weeks.

Similar to the last call phase, in additional review the Recommendation is considered as approved if no comments are received. If comments are received, it is apparent that there are some issues that still need more work, and the draft text and all comments are sent to the next Study Group meeting for further discussion and possible approval.

Those Recommendations considered as having policy or regulatory implications are approved through what is known as the Traditional Approval Process (TAP), which allows a longer period for reflection and commenting by member states. TAP Recommendations are also translated into the six working languages of ITU (Arabic, Chinese, English, French, Russian, and Spanish).

== Series and Recommendations ==
ITU-T Recommendations are the names given to telecommunications and computer protocol specification documents published by ITU-T.

=== Recommendation categorization ===
ITU-T assigns each Recommendation a name based on the series and Recommendation number. The name starts with the letter of the series the Recommendation belongs to. Each series encompasses a broad category of Recommendations, such as "H-Series Recommendations: Audiovisual and multimedia systems". The series letter is followed by a period and the Recommendation number, which uniquely identifies the Recommendation within the series. Often, a range of related Recommendations are further grouped within the series and given adjacent numbers, such as "H.200-H.499: Infrastructure of audiovisual services" or "H.260-H.279: Coding of moving video". Many numbers are "skipped" to give room for future Recommendations to be adjacent to related Recommendations. Recommendations can be revised or "superseded" and keep their existing Recommendation number.

=== Individual ITU-T Recommendations ===
1. Organization of the work of ITU-T
2. Means of expression: definitions, symbols, classification
3. General telecommunication statistics
4. General tariff principles
5. Overall network operation, telephone service, service operation and human factors
6. Non-telephone telecommunication services
7. Transmission systems and media, digital systems and networks
8. Audiovisual and multimedia systems
9. Integrated services digital network
10. Cable networks and transmission of television, sound programme and other multimedia signals
11. Protection against interference
12. Construction, installation and protection of cables and other elements of outside plant
13. TMN and network maintenance: international transmission systems, telephone circuits, telegraphy, facsimile and leased circuits
14. Maintenance: international sound programme and television transmission circuits
15. Specifications of measuring equipment
16. Terminals and subjective and objective assessment methods
17. Switching and signalling
18. Telegraph transmission
19. Telegraph services terminal equipment
20. Terminals for telematic services
21. Telegraph switching
22. Data communication over the telephone network
23. Data networks and open system communications
24. Global information infrastructure and Internet protocol aspects
25. Languages and general software aspects for telecommunication systems

== International Telecommunication Regulations (ITRs) ==
In addition to the ITU-T Recommendations, which have non-mandatory status unless they are adopted in national laws, ITU-T is also the custodian of a binding international treaty, the International Telecommunication Regulations. The ITRs go back to the earliest days of the ITU when there were two separate treaties, dealing with telegraph and telephone. The ITRs were adopted, as a single treaty, at the World Administrative Telegraphy and Telephone Conference held in Melbourne, 1988 (WATTC-88).

The ITRs comprise ten articles which deal, among other things, with the definition of international telecommunication services, cooperation between countries and national administrations, safety of life and priority of telecommunications and charging and accounting principles. The adoption of the ITRs in 1988 is often taken as the start of the wider liberalization process in international telecommunications, though a few countries, including United States and United Kingdom, had made steps to liberalize their markets before 1988.

The Constitution and Convention of ITU provides for the amendment of ITRs through a World Conference on International Telecommunications (WCIT). Accordingly, in 1998 there began a process of review of the ITRs; and in 2009 extensive preparations began for such a conference, WCIT-12. In addition to "regional preparatory meetings", the ITU Secretariat developed 13 "Background Briefs on key issues" that were expected to be discussed at the conference. Convened by former ITU secretary-general Hamadoun Touré, the Conference, WCIT-12, was then held in Dubai, United Arab Emirates, during the period 3–14 December 2014.

== AI for Good ==
The Standardization Sector of ITU also organizes AI for Good, the United Nations platform for the sustainable development of Artificial Intelligence.

== Hot topics ==
- ITU-T has expressed a commitment to "bridging the standardization gap" – disparities in the ability of developing countries, relative to developed ones, to access, implement, contribute to and influence international ICT standards.
- The ICT Security Standards Roadmap has been developed to assist in the development of security standards by bringing together information about existing standards and current standards work in key standards development organizations.
- The Next Generation Networks (NGN) concept takes into consideration new realities in the telecommunication industry characterized by factors such as; the need to converge and optimize the operating networks and the extraordinary expansion of digital traffic (i.e., increasing demand for new multimedia services, mobility, etc.).
- ITU newslog (February 2014). First of its kind publication features ITU-T standards for smart grid and home networking.

== See also ==
- ITU Radio Regulations
- Global Standards Collaboration
- ITU-R recommendations
- ITU-T recommendations
- World Summit on the Information Society
- World Standards Day
