= Abdul Malik Mydin =

Malaysian swimmer (born 1975)

Dato' Abdul Malik Mydin
- Born: Abdul Malik Mydin; November 30, 1974 (age 51); Penang, Malaysia
- Occupation: solo long-distance swimmer
- Known for: first Malaysian and Southeast Asian to swim across the English Channel on 3 August 2003

Dato Abdul Malik Mydin (born 30 November 1974) is a Malaysian solo long-distance swimmer, hailing from Penang. He was notable as the first Malaysian and Southeast Asian to swim across the English Channel on 3 August 2003, successfully completing the journey in 17 hours and 42 minutes.

== Athletic career ==
Malik finished sixth in a 26 km on the Lake Zurich Swim in Switzerland in August 2002, among 22 international swimmers.

Malik had also conducted several solo swims locally, including swims between Penang and the mainland (7.8 km to 12 km), Pulau Besar to Mersing (18 km), and Kuala Perlis to Kuah (48 km, in 14 hours)

=== English Channel swim ===
Abdul Malik announced his intention to swim across the English Channel in May 2003, setting a target of 18 hours to swim 32.8 km from England to France in July or August, and receiving coaching and advice from John Van Wisse, an Australian coach who once spoke at the Victorian Brighton rotary club. The swim was initially delayed to late July due to weather, and was finally organised on 3 August.

During preparations of the cross-channel swim, Malik was originally intended to start from Shakespeare Beach, but was advised by navigator Mike Oram to start from Abbots Beach in Dover, England. The cross-channel swim saw Malik flagged off at Abbots Beach at 2:02 am, local time (9:02 am, Malaysian time, 3 August), stroking at a consistent pace and stopping only for feeds at 20-minute intervals.

Malik reached Cap Gris Nez in Calais, France at 8:42 pm French time (7:42 pm, British time; 2:42 am Malaysian time, 4 August), completing the swim in 17 hours and 42 minutes, just 18 minutes less Malik's 18-hour target. He claimed that windy weather during the last kilometres of his swim hampered attempts to finish his swim hours earlier.

He was hailed by supporters as a national hero upon his return to Malaysia on 9 August. However, his record lasted less than a year, and was broken on 13 July 2004 by fellow Malaysian, 20-year-old Lennard Lee who swam the channel in 9 hours and 45 minutes. Lee holds the fastest Asian time for swimming the English Channel.

== Present life ==
He now serves as the chairman of Airport Limo Malaysia, which provides airport limousine services.

== See also ==
- Azhar Mansor
