= Wisse =

Wisse is a Dutch given name and patronymic surname. The given name may come via "Wiso" from the Germanic root -wisu-, meaning "good". The surname "van Wisse" is a Dutch toponymic surname and has a separate origin.

== Given name ==
- Wisse Dekker (1924–2012), Dutch businessman
- Wisse Alfred Pierre Smit (1903–1986), Dutch poet and historian

== Surname ==
- Donovan Wisse (born 1997), Surinamese kickboxer
- Mabel Wisse Smit (born 1968), widow of Prince Friso of Orange-Nassau
- Ruth Wisse (born 1936), writer and academic
- Yvonne Wisse (born 1982), Dutch heptathlete

Van Wisse

- Robert Francis Van Wisse (born 1965), American criminal
- Tammy van Wisse (born 1968), Australian long-distance swimmer

== See also ==
- Ancrene Wisse, a monastic manual for female anchorites
