= Brighton Icebergers =

Coordinates: 37.91021°S 144.98490°E

The Brighton Icebergers or Brighton Icebergs are an Australian swimming team based at the Baths Health Club in Brighton, Victoria. They swim in the sea pool in the early morning, when the water temperature can be as low as 7 °C (45 °F). A larger contingent swims at the nearby Royal Brighton Yacht Club in the open waters of Port Phillip Bay,

Their swims include a weekly Sunday 1.4-kilometre (1,500 yd) "inside no-brainer" alongside Middle Brighton pier, and have organized annual competitive events including the 2-kilometre (1.2 mi) John Locco Winter Invitational, the Greg Fountain Winter Pier to Pub, the Iceberger World Championship of the Bay Swim, and the Olsen Hooper Summer Handicap Swim, and awarded an Iceberger International Swimmer of the Year.

== History ==
The club's long-time organizer is former school teacher John Locco, elected to Brighton Council in 1984 when the Brighton swimming baths had been in danger of closing, and later served as Mayor as well getting into a fist-fight with Baths Manager Mark Greene. He is said to have founded the club in the 1980s, but swims were already taking place in the 1950s. In 2015 the Royal Brighton Yacht Club caused a dispute by seeking to formalize governance of the Icebergers.

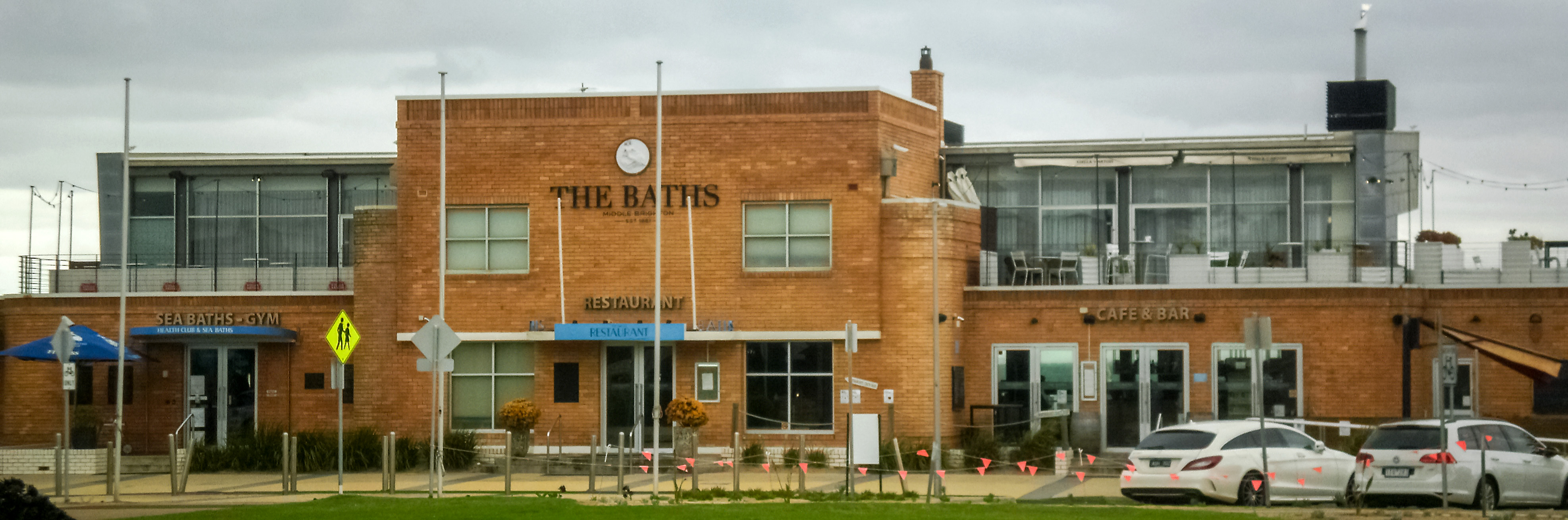
Brighton Baths Health Club, where the Icebergers swim

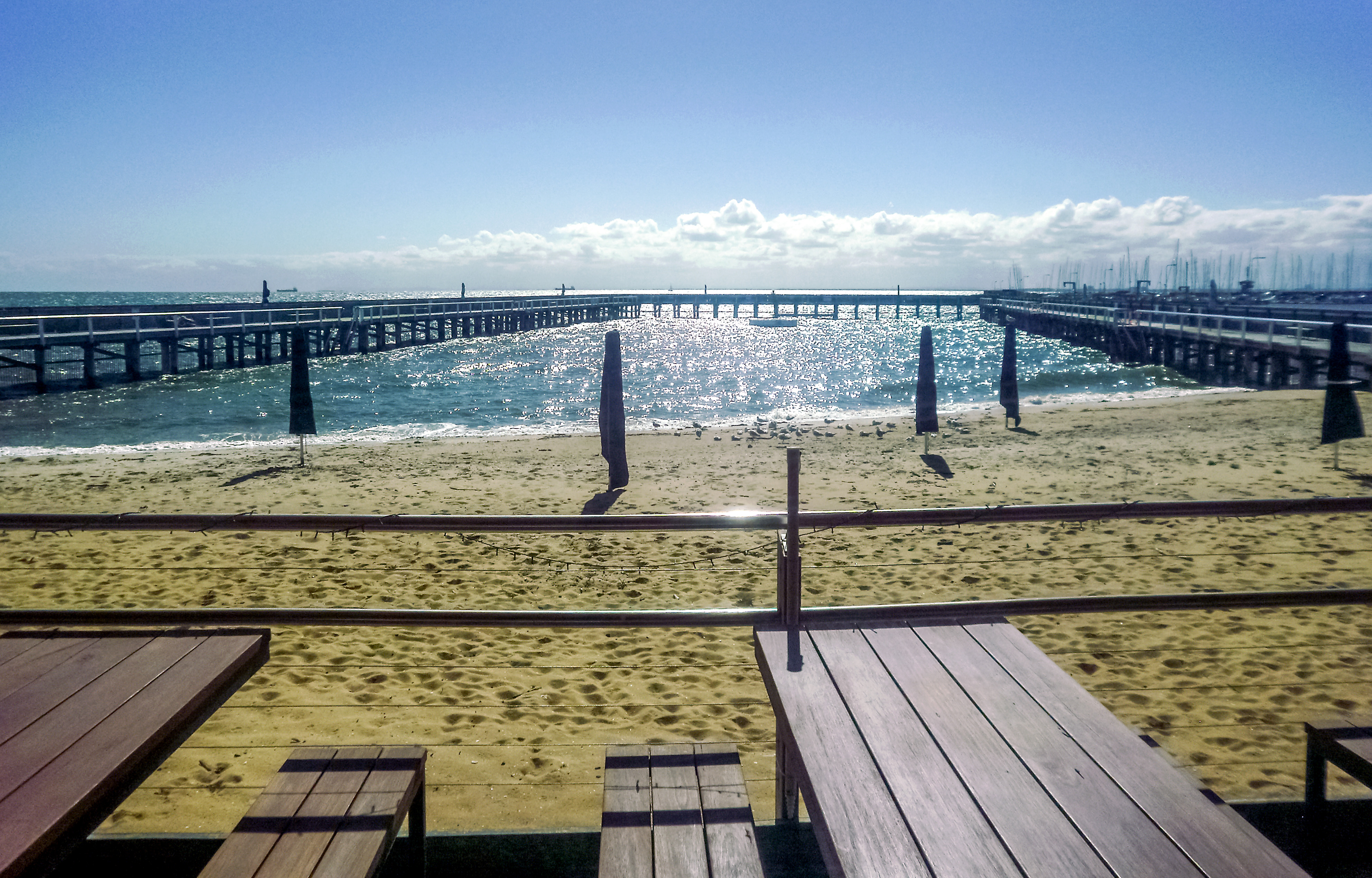
Inside of the Brighton Baths

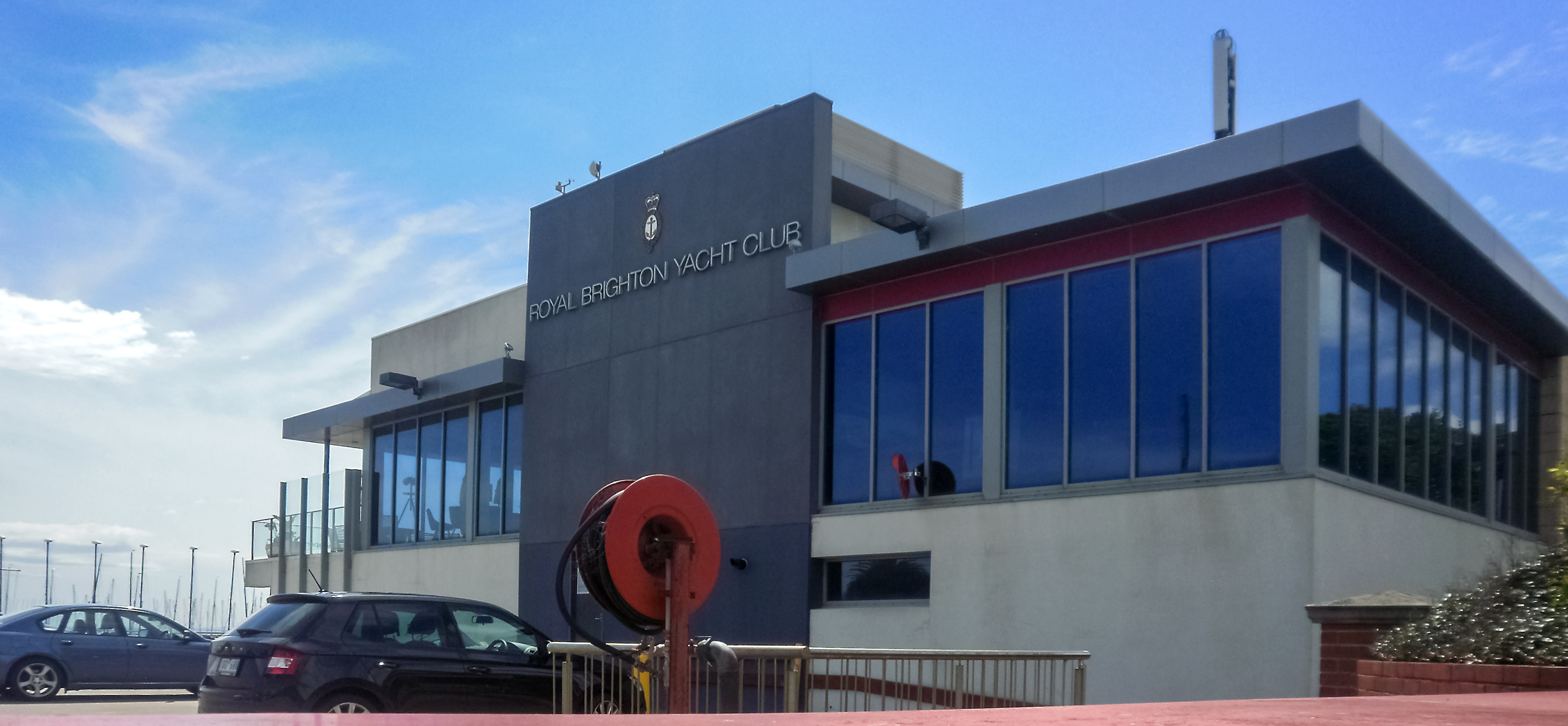
The Royal Brighton Yacht Club near the Baths Health club

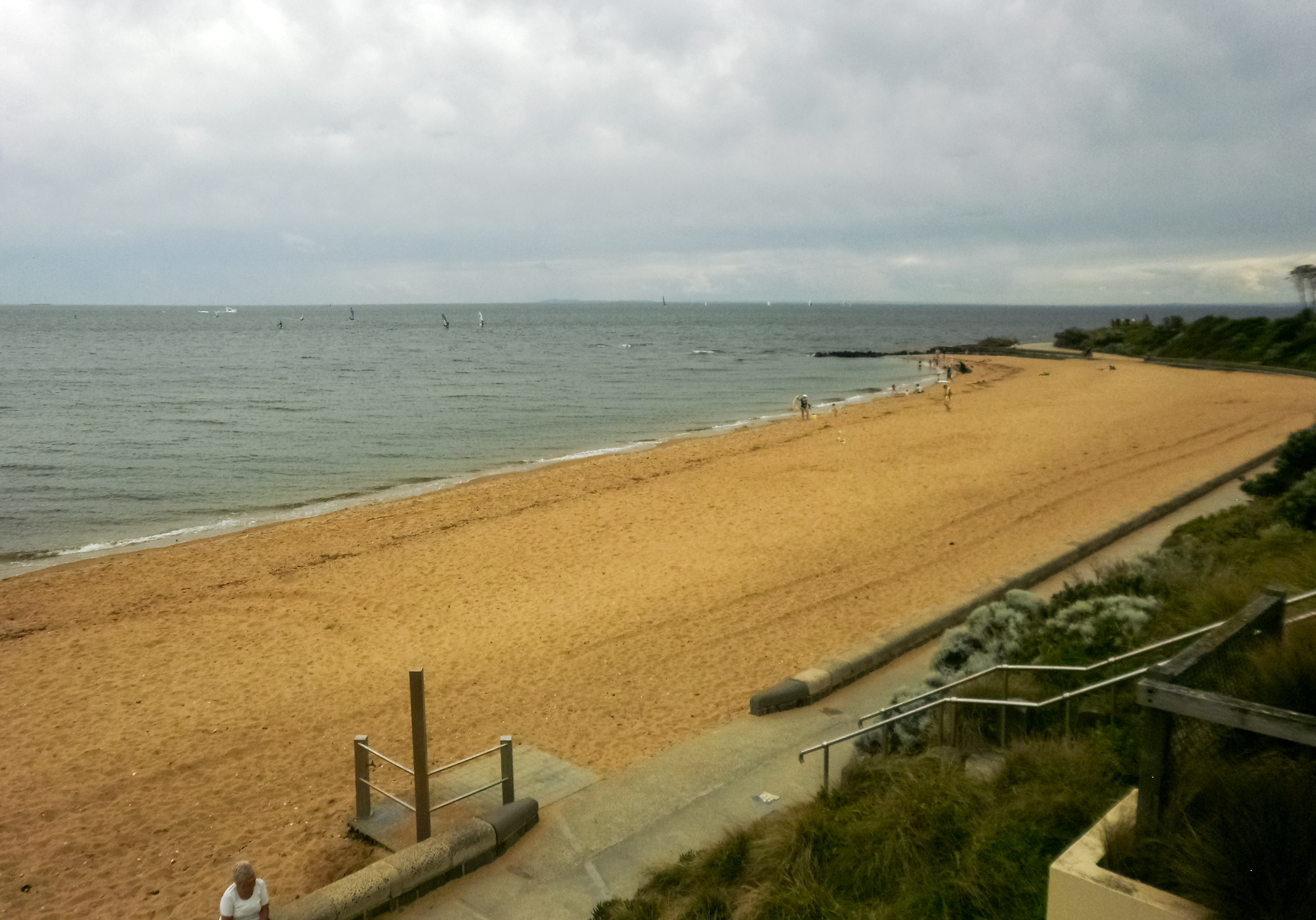
Brighton beach

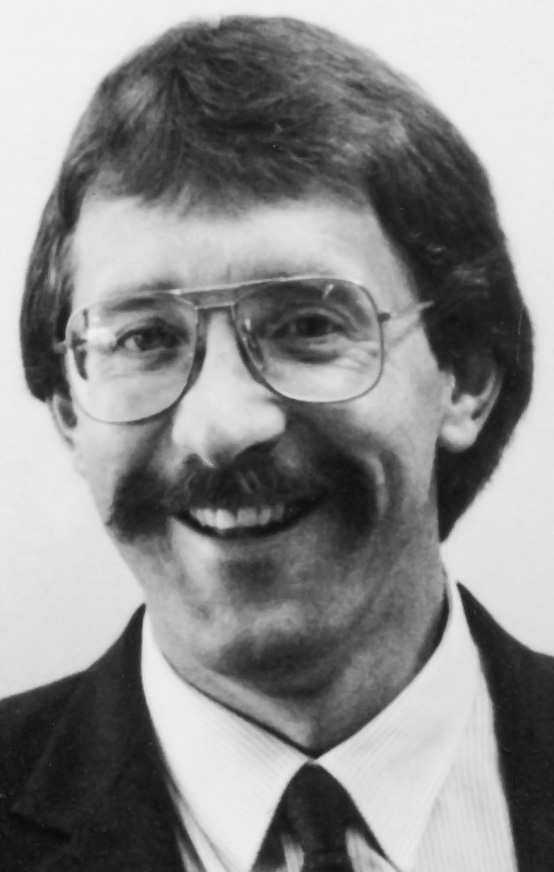
Long term Icebergers organiser John Locco

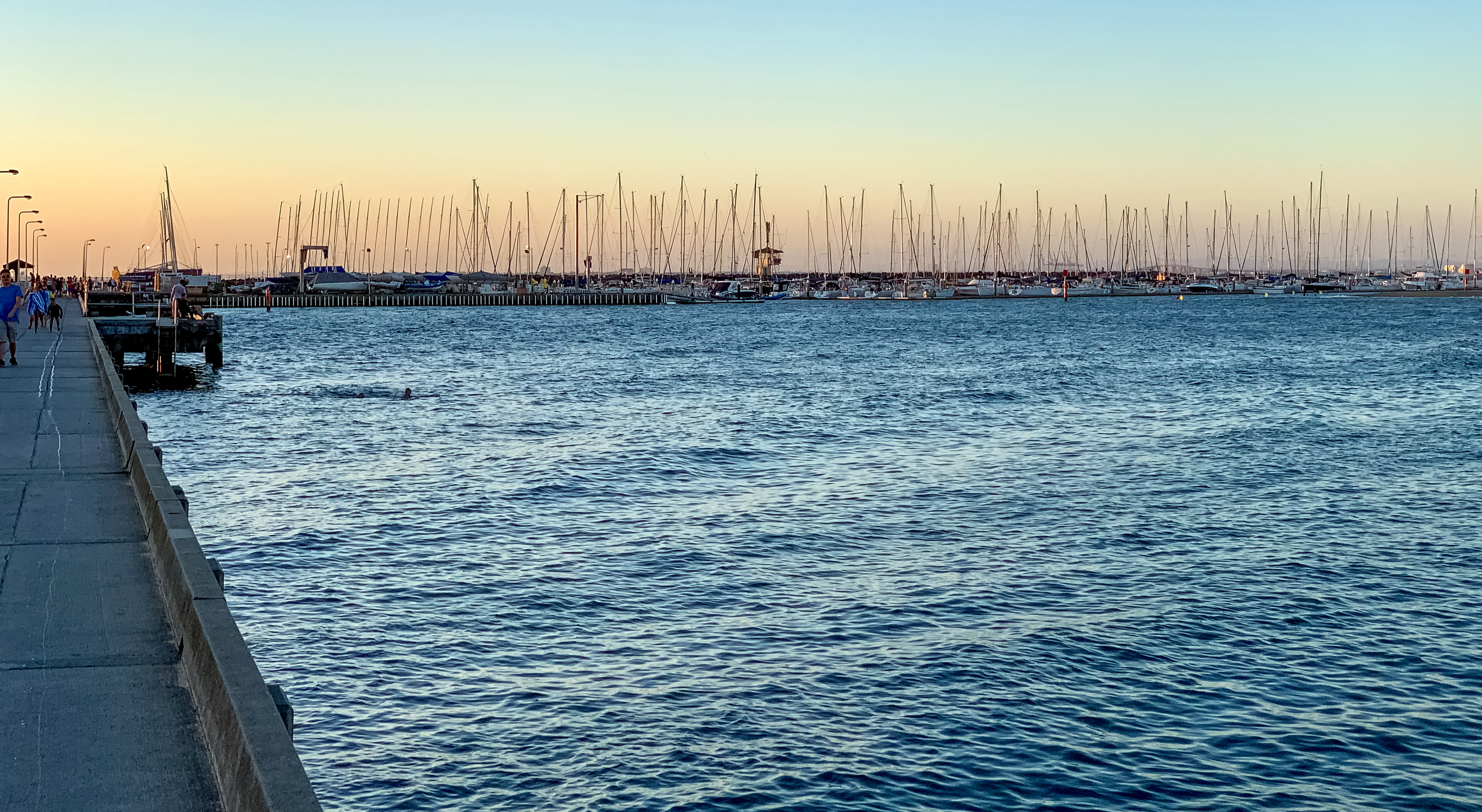
Middle Brighton Pier outside Yacht club

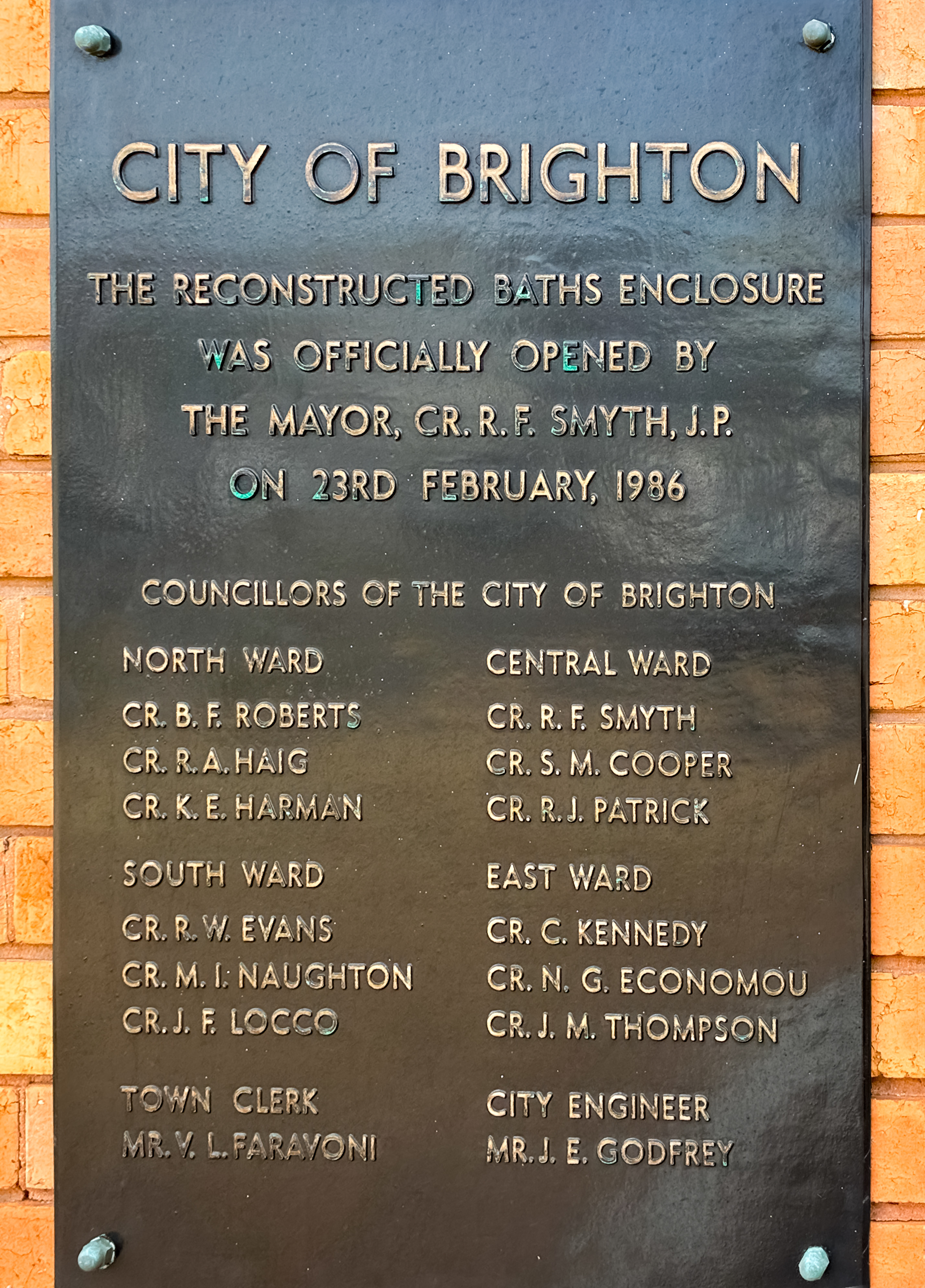
City of Brighton plaque

== Media ==
British-Australian comedian David Brooks made a comic documentary about the group in 2013, originally titled Discovering the Icebergers and later An Iceberger with the Lot: From Bury to Brighton. Another documentary about the group, titled Icebergers and directed by Darcy Newton, won best documentary at the 2020 Melbourne Indie Film Festival.

Don Warner's Beyond The Tip: Tales of the Icebergers of Brighton was published in 2019.

== Notable swimmers ==
- Ted Baillieu, Premier of Victoria from 2010 to 2013
- David Brooks, comedian
- Dan Canta, who joined the club at 13 and at 17 became the youngest male to achieve the Triple Crown of Open Water Swimming
- Max Hudghton, former player for St Kilda Football Club
- Stewart Loewe, former player for St Kilda Football Club
- Andrew Robb, former Liberal politician
- John Van Wisse, swimmer and trainer
