= U Thant Peace Award =

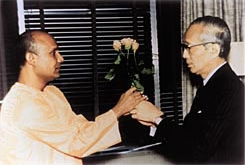
Sri Chinmoy and U Thant, 1972

The U Thant Peace Award was created by Sri Chinmoy's peace meditations at the United Nations, after U Thant's death. First offered in 1982, the award is given to individuals and organizations who have exemplified the lofty spiritual ideals of the late United Nations Secretary-General U Thant and implemented those ideals in the tireless pursuit of world peace.

== Recipients ==
It had been bestowed by The Peace Meditation at the United Nations upon Mahathir Mohamad, Nelson Mandela, Mikhail Gorbachev, Pope John Paul II, Mother Teresa, Javier Pérez de Cuéllar, Kurt Waldheim the Dalai Lama, Desmond Tutu, Dada Vaswani, Swami Satchidananda and U Thant's daughter, Daw Aye Aye Thant.

The U Thant Distinguished Lecture Series is a forum through which eminent thinkers and world leaders speak on the role of the United Nations in addressing the challenges facing the world's peoples and nations in the 21st century. The lecture series is co-organized by the United Nations University and the Science Council of Japan.

The UNU has a tradition of inviting world leaders and renowned individuals to Tokyo to explore the role of the United Nations in a rapidly changing world. The U Thant Distinguished Lecture Series builds upon this tradition by providing an opportunity for Nobel laureates and heads of state, current and former, to share their insights and experiences with scholars, policymakers, business leaders and the public.

On April 8, 2006, the Award was offered to Kofi Annan, who refused it. Similarly in 2007, Ban Ki-moon declined the Award.

== Recipients of the U Thant Peace award ==
Year	Recipient	Country
1982	Zenon Rossides	Cyprus
1983	Jorge Illueca	Panama
1986	Javier Pérez de Cuéllar	Peru
1986	Russell Barber	United States
1991	Vilayat Khan	India
1991	Guido de Marco	Malta
1993	Ganesh Man Singh	Nepal
1993	Siddhartha Shankar Ray	India
1993	Chidambaram Subramaniam	India
1994	James P. Grant	United States
1994	Mother Teresa	India
1994	Mikhail Gorbachev	Russia
1995	Laxmi Mall Singhvi	India
1995	Rafael Hernández Colón	Puerto Rico
1995	Desmond Tutu	South Africa
1996	Nelson Mandela	South Africa
1996	Robert Mugabe	Zimbabwe
1996	Maurice Strong	Canada
1996	Chakravarthi V. Narasimhan	India
1997	Ananda Guruge	Sri Lanka
1997	Vladimir Petrovsky	Russia
1997	Carl Lewis	United States
1997	14th Dalai Lama	China
1997	Inder Kumar Gujral	India
1998	Dada Vaswani	India
1998	Pope John Paul II	Poland
1998	Claiborne Pell	United States
1998	Ja'afar of Negeri Sembilan	Malaysia
1999	Mahathir Mohamad	Malaysia
1999	Girija Prasad Koirala	Nepal
1999	Krishna Prasad Bhattarai	Nepal
1999	Ted Turner	United States
1999	Anwarul Karim Chowdhury	Bangladesh
2000	Svenn Kristiansen	Norway
2000	Humayun Rashid Choudhury	Bangladesh
2000	Gary Ackerman	United States
2000	Sivaya Subramuniyaswami	United States
2001	Atal Bihari Vajpayee	India
2001	James Parks Morton	United States
2002	Satchidananda Saraswati	India
2002	Daw Aye Aye Thant	Myanmar
2002	Ravi Shankar	India
2004	Kurt Waldheim	Austria
2007	Ibrahim Gambari	Nigeria
2007	Bill Pearl	United States
2007	Pascal Alan Nazareth	India
