= Black Rock, Victoria =

Black Rock
- Suburb
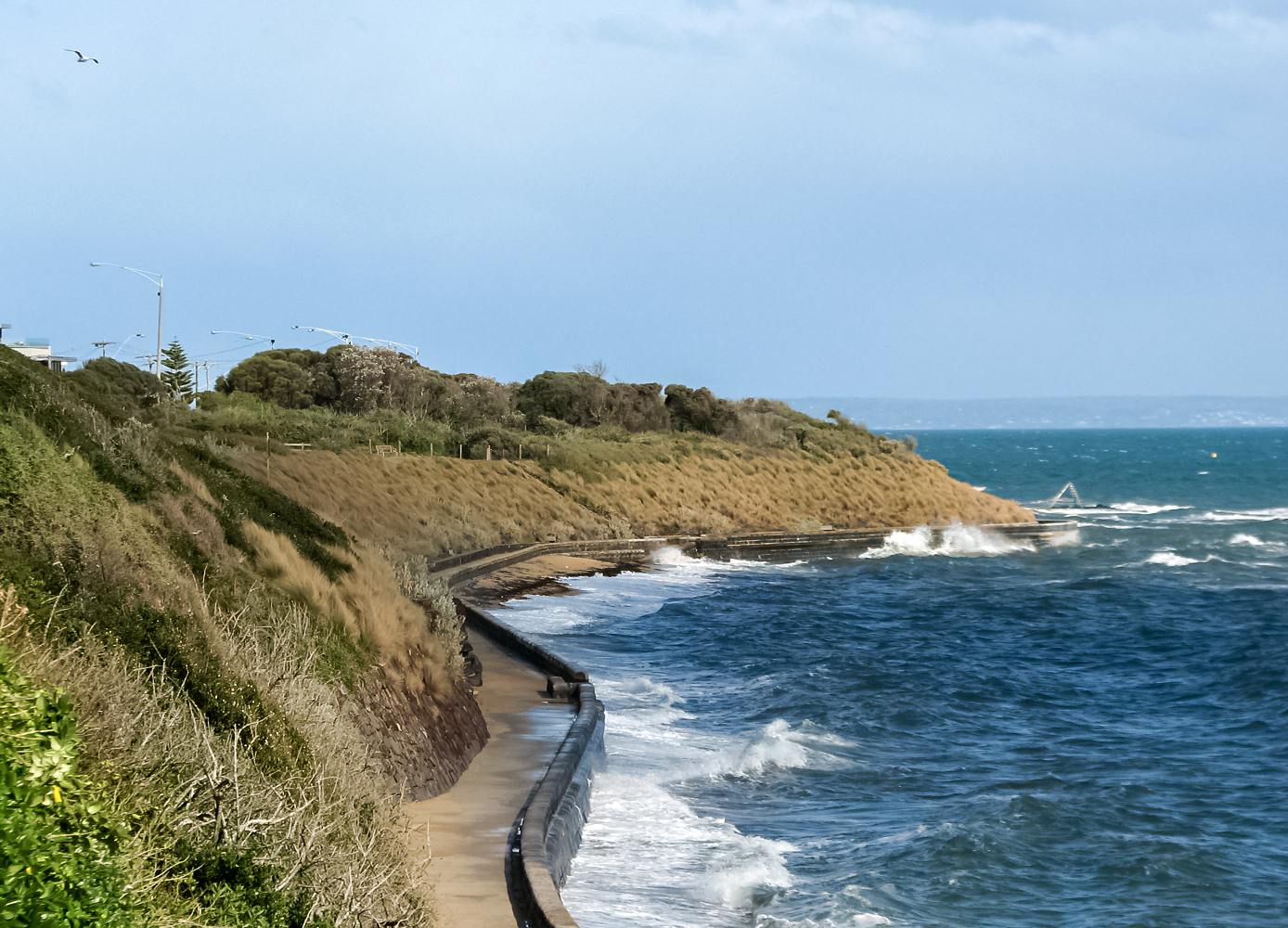

- Interactive map of Black Rock
- Coordinates: 37.972°S 145.021°E
- Country: Australia
- State: Victoria
- City: Melbourne
- LGA: City of Bayside
- Location: 18 km (11 mi) from Melbourne

Government
  - State electorate: Sandringham
  - Federal division: Goldstein

Area
  - Total: 3.7 km^{2} (1.4 sq mi)
- Elevation: 16 m (52 ft)

Population
  - Total: 6,389 (2021 census)
  - Density: 1,727/km^{2} (4,470/sq mi)
- Postcode: 3193
Suburbs around Black Rock
Port Phillip	Sandringham	Cheltenham
Port Phillip	Black Rock	Beaumaris
Port Phillip	Port Phillip	Beaumaris

Black Rock is a suburb in Melbourne, Victoria, Australia, 18 km south-east of Melbourne's Central Business District, located within the City of Bayside local government area. Black Rock recorded a population of 6,389 at the 2021 census.

== History ==
The suburb was named after eponymous grand residence built by Charles Ebden in 1856, who had taken the name from Black Rock, Dublin. Ebden was an early Port Phillip pastoralist, businessman, and parliamentarian who represented the seat of Brighton in the Victorian Parliament; having earlier sat in the Parliament of New South Wales.

The northern part of the suburb between Beach Road and Bluff Road was one of the early estates in the parish of Moorabbin developed by Josiah Holloway in the 1850s. Named Bluff Town, sales were slower than in other areas and the suburb grew slowly.

One of the notable characteristics of the Black Rock shoreline is Red Bluff. The bluff's name comes from the oxidised iron in the cliffs which gives off a burnt orange colour. Either side of Red Bluff are many popular beaches and seaside destinations, including Half Moon Bay, a setting for yachting since the 1890s. A branch of the Brighton Yacht Club formed the Black Rock Yacht Club in 1919. A rock breakwater was constructed and in 1926 the hull of the colonial naval vessel HMVS Cerberus was added to further protect the boat haven.

In 1888, the year after the railway was extended to Sandringham, a horse tram was provided between Sandringham and Black Rock, running on to Beaumaris. The service, which lasted until 1914, was replaced by an electric tram service (operated by the Victorian Railways) in 1919, which ran slightly inland of the horse tram service. In 1931, the line was cut back to Black Rock, and the entire line closed in 1956. In 1910 a State primary school was opened in Black Rock which continues to operate to this day.

The first Post Office in the area was Red Bluff to the north, which opened on 17 April 1901 and closed in 1969. The first Black Rock Post Office opened on 23 April 1902, was renamed Half Moon Bay in 1922 and closed in 1968. The second Black Rock Post Office opened in 1922 near the corner of Bluff Road and Balcombe Road.

=== Heritage listing ===
The following place in Black Rock is listed on the Victorian Heritage Register:

- Black Rock House, 30–36 Ebden Avenue, now an historic house museum

== Today ==
Like many neighbouring suburbs, the residential development in Black Rock dates partly in the postwar period and due to active conservation movements for the protection of native plants beside roads and on heathlands, Black Rock boasts beautiful surrounds. There are many recreational reserves located throughout the shoreline and near the town centre. The major shopping centre in Black Rock, located at the intersection of Bluff, Beach and Balcombe Roads is home to the prominent Black Rock Clock Tower.

== Population ==
In the 2016 Census, there were 6,159 people in Black Rock. 71.8% of people were born in Australia. The next most common countries of birth were England 6.6% and New Zealand 1.9%. 83.8% of people spoke only English at home. Other languages spoken at home included Greek at 2.2%. The most common responses for religion were No Religion 38.1%, Catholic 21.4% and Anglican 15.8%.

== Landmarks ==
- The HMVS Cerberus - A breakwater in Half Moon Bay formed by the sunken wreck of Australia's first ironclad warship, HMVS Cerberus
- Black Rock Clock Tower - A large four sided public clock mounted on a tall brick structure in the middle of a roundabout at the intersection of Beach Road and Balcombe Road. A popular starting point for cycle rides along Beach Road including the (in)famous "Hell Ride".
- Black Rock Life Saving Club founded in 1928, continues to serve the local community today.
- Black Rock House - a grand residence built by Charles Hotson Ebden in 1856
- 'The Rock' - fine Edwardian residence on Beach Road near the clock tower
- Red Bluff cliffs - cliffs along the beach in Black Rock located next to Half Moon Bay

== Parks and gardens ==
- Black Rock Gardens and Playgrounds
  Location: Opposite Clock Tower, Beach Road
- F.G. Tricks Reserve
  Location: Cnr Bluff Road and Fern Street

== Sport ==
The suburb has an Australian Rules football team competing in the Southern Football League.

Golfers play at the course of the Royal Melbourne Golf Club on Cheltenham Road.

== Notable former residents ==
- Richard E. Butler, ITU Secretary-General
- Edward Bertram Johnston, politician
- Andrew Lauterstein, Olympic swimmer
- Donald Alaster Macdonald, journalist
- James Manson, former Collingwood premiership player
- Alan Marshall, writer and story teller
- Kirstie Marshall, aerial skier and Victorian state politician
- Shane Warne, Australian cricketer

== Gallery ==
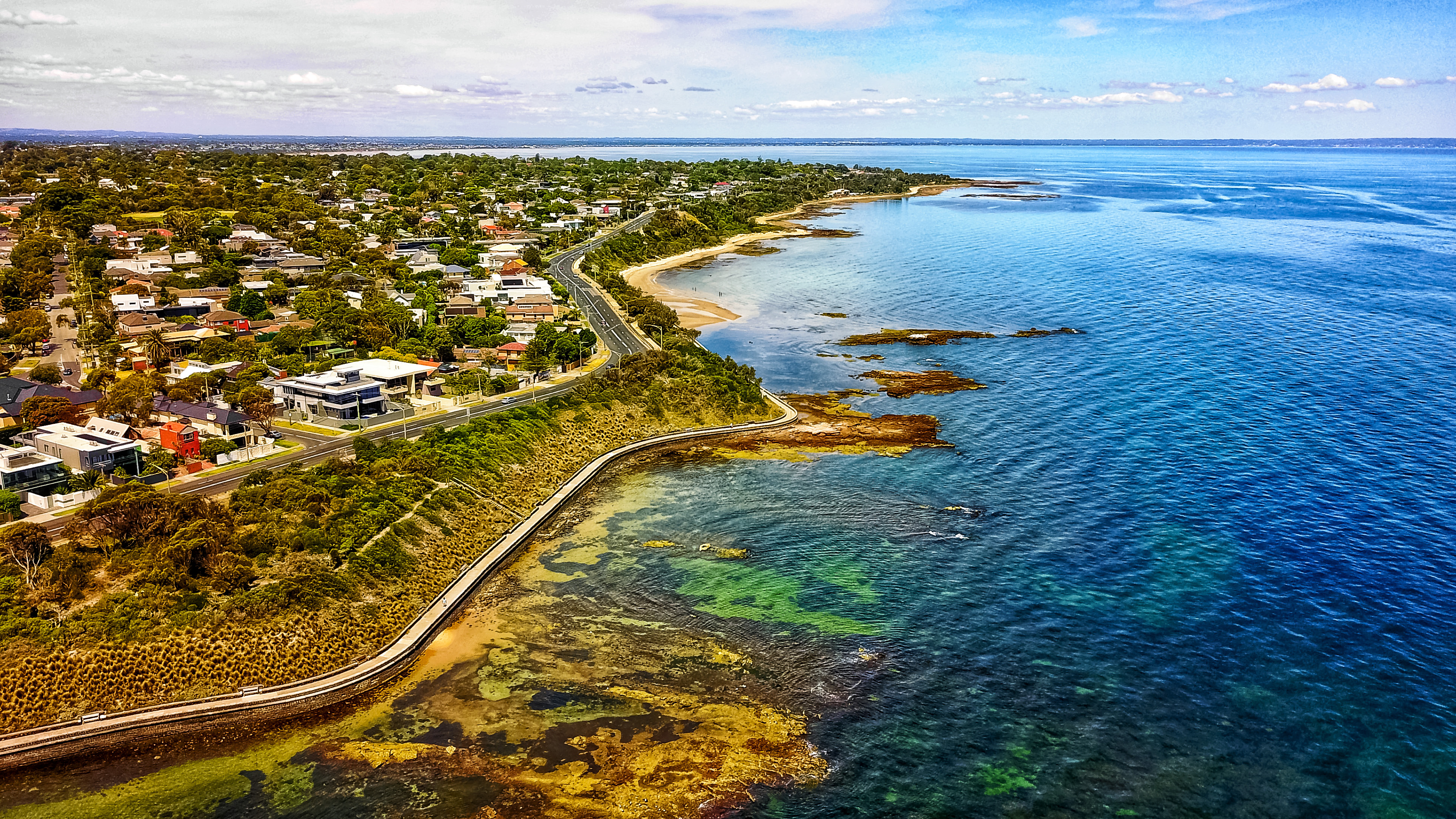
Aerial view of Black Rock, looking south along Port Philip Bay.

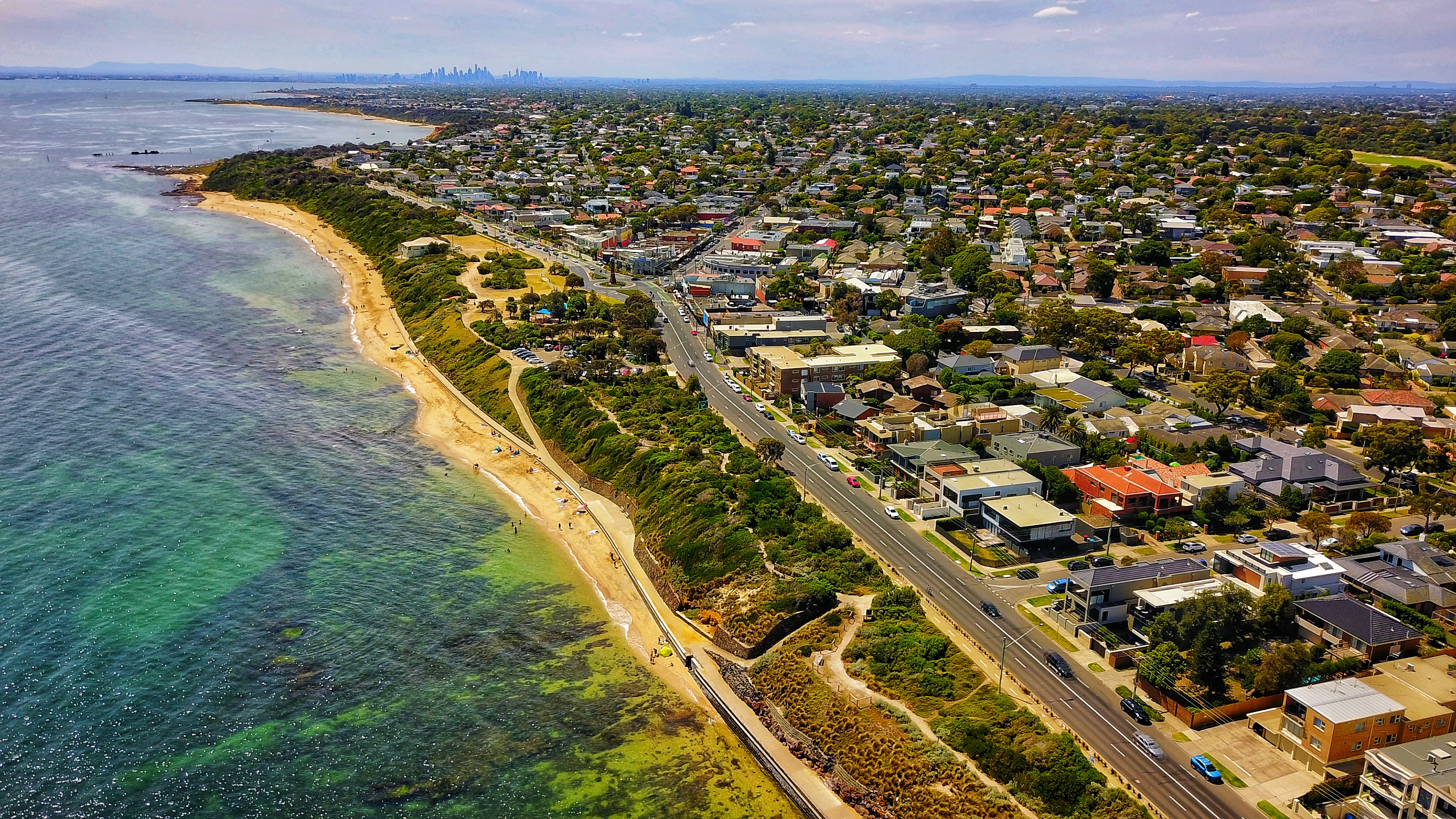
Aerial view of Black Rock relative to Port Philip Bay and Melbourne CBD.

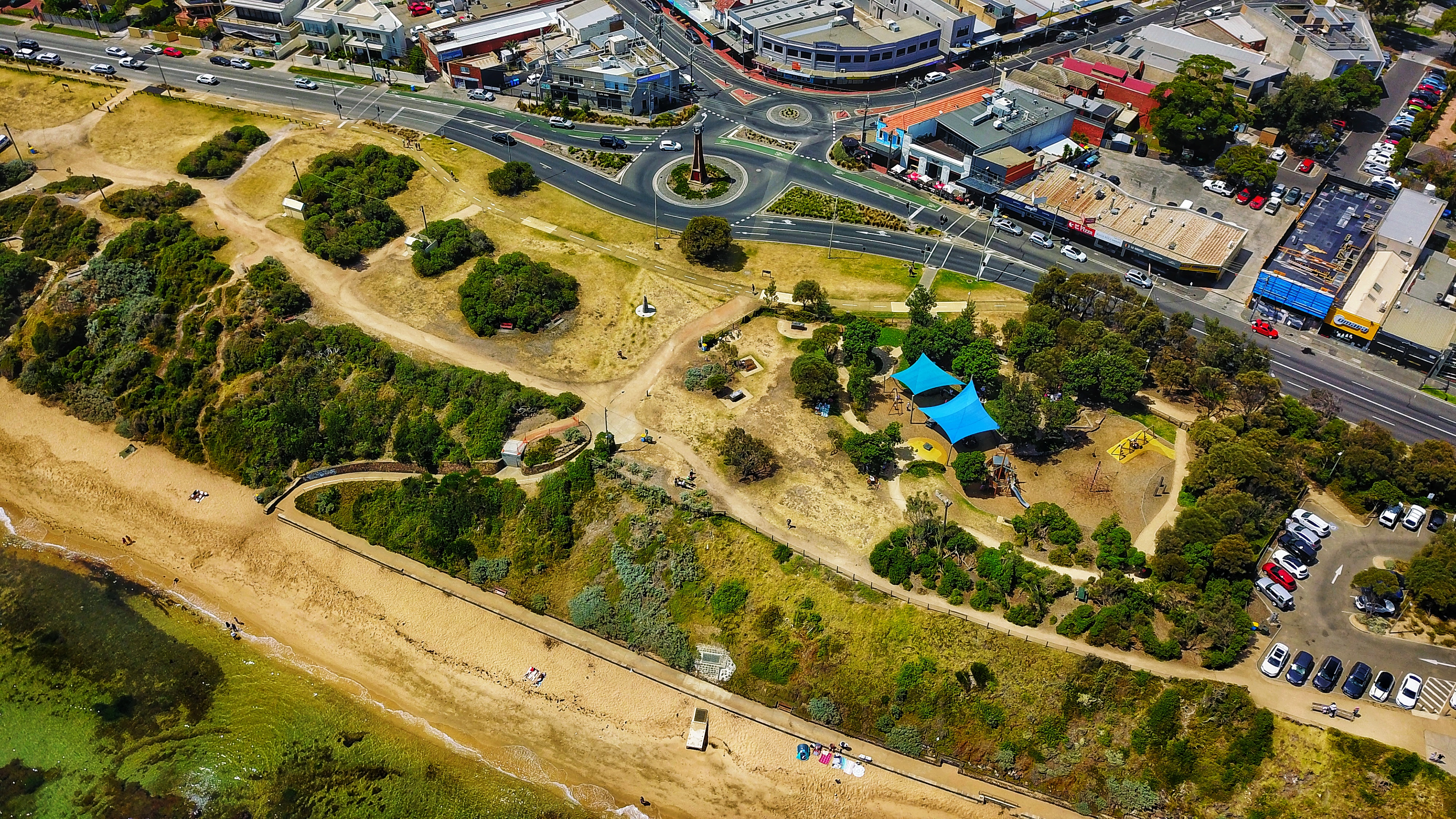
Aerial view of Black Rock Gardens.

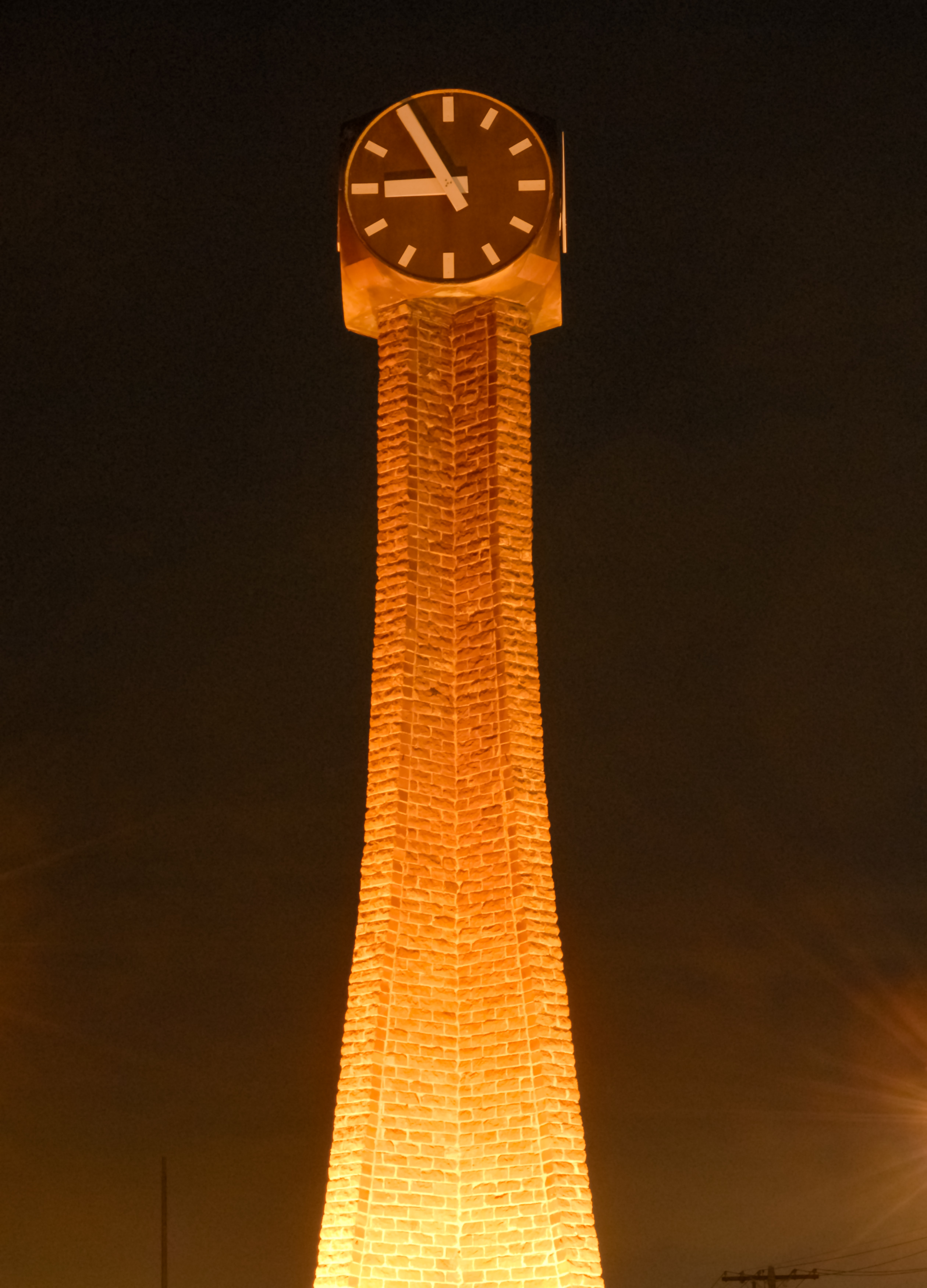
The Black Rock Clock Tower is synonymous with the Melbourne suburb of Black Rock, next to the suburb of Beaumaris. The clock tower is often used as a reference point for cyclists riding along the popular Beach Road.

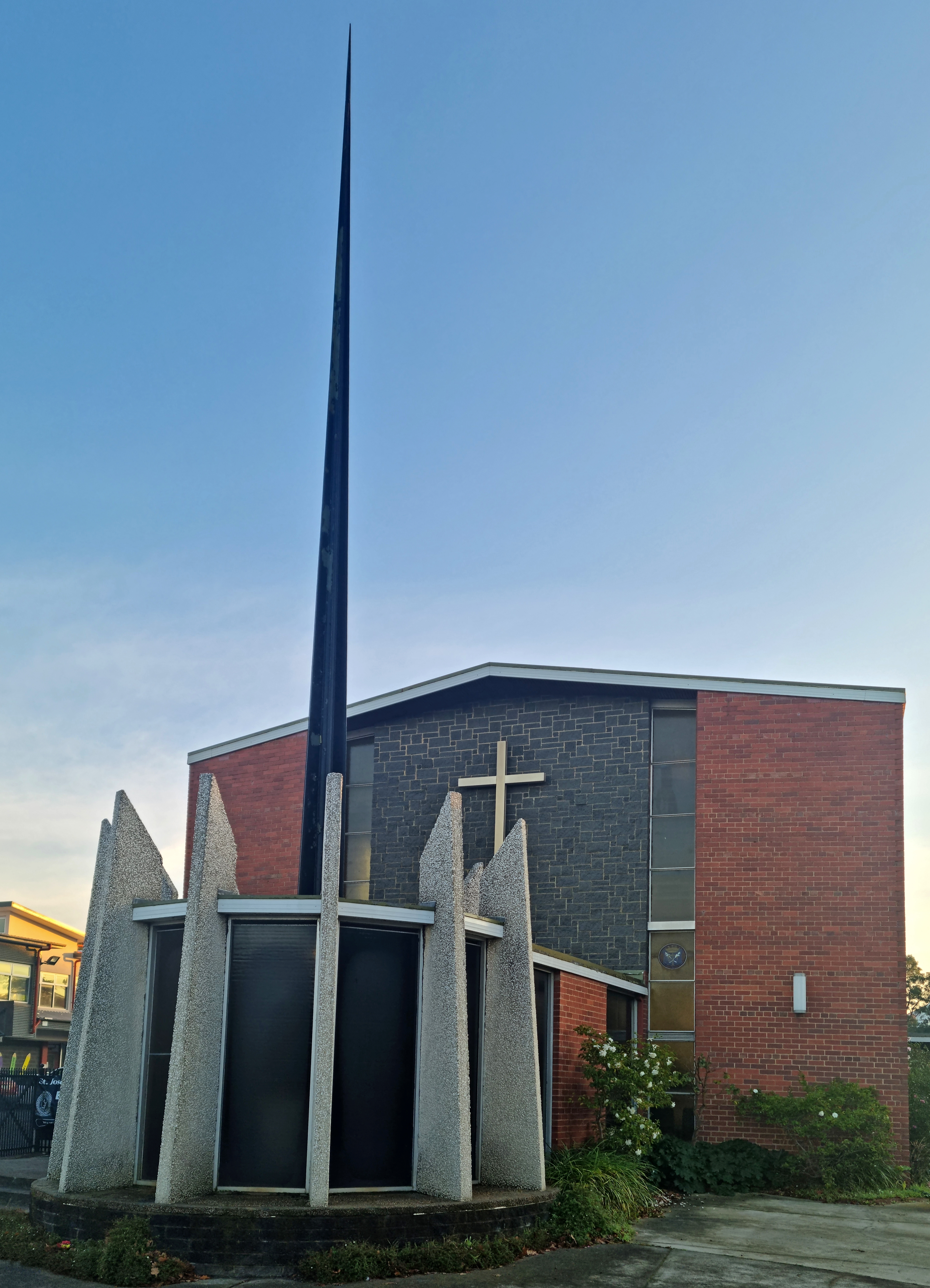
St Josephs Catholic Church at Black Rock

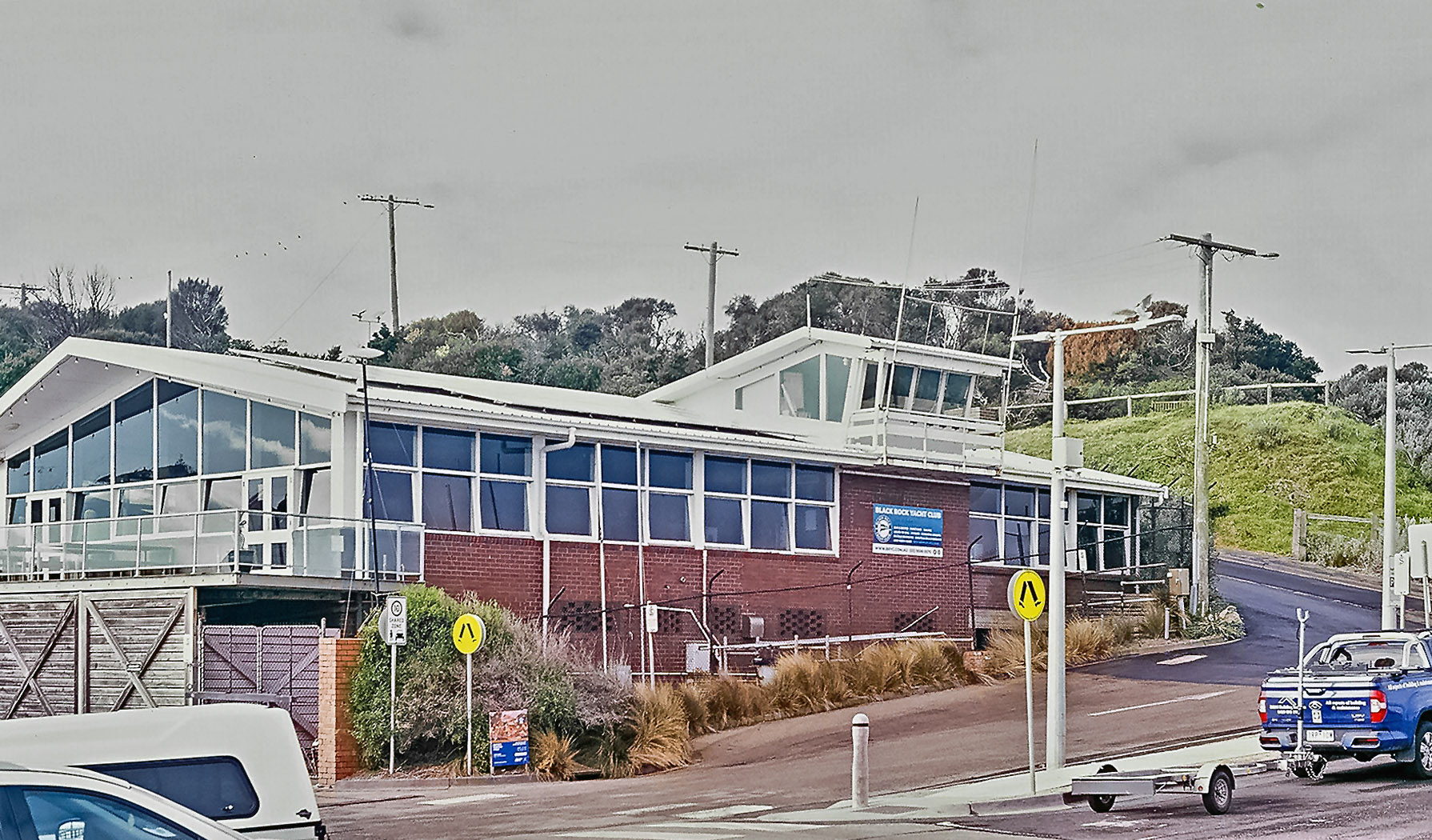
Yacht club at Black Rock

== See also ==
- City of Sandringham – Black Rock was previously within this former local government area.
