= Half Moon Bay (Victoria) =

Bay and neighbourhood in Victoria, Australia

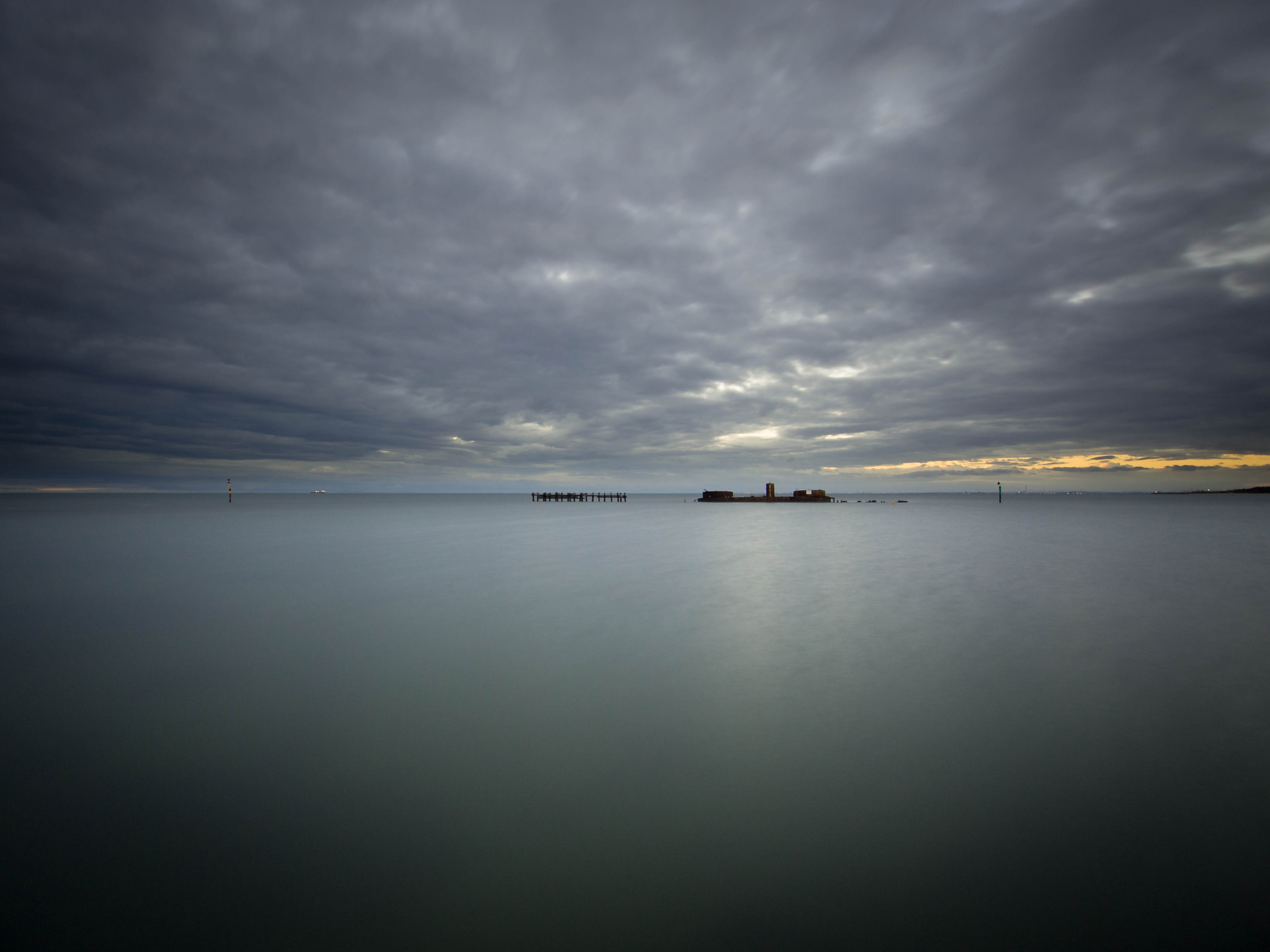
- Half Moon Bay

- Location of the bay in Greater Metropolitan Melbourne
- Interactive map of Half Moon Bay
- Location: Port Phillip, Victoria
- Coordinates: 37°58′01″S 145°0′39″E
- Type: Bay
- Primary outflows: Port Phillip
- Frozen: never
- Settlements: Black Rock

The Half Moon Bay is a bay and neighbourhood on Port Phillip, south east of Melbourne. Located in the suburb of Black Rock, it is home to the Black Rock Yacht Club, the Half Moon Bay Lifesaving Club and the Cerberus Beach House Restaurant and Beach Kiosk. The bay gets a mention in the Cat Empire song, "The Wine Song".

Half Moon Bay is also home to HMVS Cerberus, the last surviving monitor warship in the world, which acts as a breakwater. Half Moon Bay has a lifesaving club and a pier and has the Red Bluff Cliffs just along the beach. The cliffs were briefly featured in the movie "Mad Max'" as well as the 1990's children's television series "Round The Twist". Half Moon Bay also has aquatic life which makes good snorkelling. It features many coastal processes.

The first Black Rock Post Office opened here on 23 April 1902, was renamed Half Moon Bay in 1922 and closed in 1968.

There are two other Half Moon Bays in Port Phillip; one at Mount Eliza and another at Indented Head. There is also another Half Moon Bay near Torquay.
