= Dada Vaswani =

Indian spiritual leader

Dada J. P. Vaswani
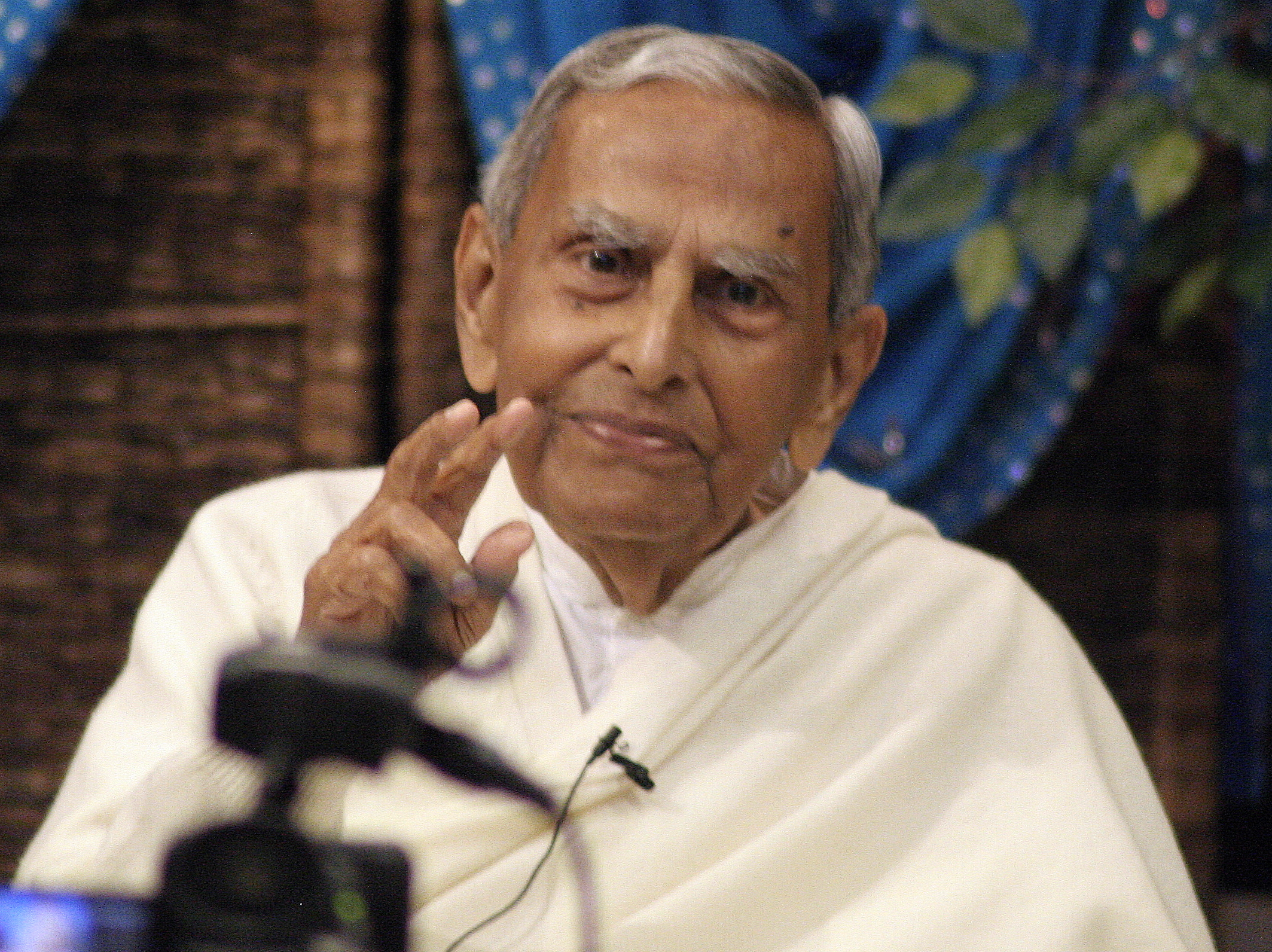
- Dada Vaswani

Personal life
- Born: Jashan Pahlajrai Vaswani; 2 August 1918 Hyderabad, Sindh, British India
- Died: 12 July 2018 (aged 99) Pune, Maharashtra, India
- Honors: U Thant Peace Award

Religious life
- Religion: Hinduism
- Sect: Nonsectarian

Religious career
- Teacher: Sadhu Vaswani

Jashan Pahlajrai Vaswani (2 August 1918 – 12 July 2018), better known as Dada Vaswani, was an Indian spiritual leader. He promoted vegetarianism and animal rights, and was the spiritual head at the Sadhu Vaswani Mission founded by his Guru, Sadhu Vaswani. The Mission, a non-profit organization headquartered in Pune, India, has centers around the world. Vaswani authored about 150 self-help books in Sindhi and English.

== Early life ==
Born in Hyderabad, Sindh to Krishnadevi and Pahlajrai Vaswani was one of seven siblings: three sisters, and four brothers. Pahlajrai, his father, worked with the Hyderabad Training College for Teachers, eventually becoming the supervisor of all primary schools in Karachi. Krishnadevi, his mother, was one of the first few women to have benefited from some English education in those days.

== Education ==
Vaswani's formal education started at the age of three. Taking two double promotions, Vaswani finished his primary education in three years instead of the usual five. Completing his primary education from the T. C. Primary School at seven years of age, a special tutor was then engaged to coach him in the English language. Vaswani later transferred him to an English-medium school. Next, he was admitted to the Rosary School, wherein he received a triple promotion, enabling him to join High School much earlier. Vaswani then moved on to the St. Patrick's School where he completed two years before his father died. The family was plunged into a severe financial crisis and he had to move to the N. J. High School, which was a government school.

== Global addresses ==
Vaswani spoke at numerous venues including the Palace of Westminster in London, the Global Forum of Spiritual Leaders in Oxford, the World Parliament of Religions in Chicago, and the Millennium World Peace Summit of Religious and Spiritual Leaders at the United Nations in New York.

- Parliament of World Religions – Cape Town South Africa- December 1999
- The Millennium World Peace Summit (MWPS) at the Launch of the World Council of Religious Leaders – Bangkok – 12 June 2002

== The Moment of Calm ==
Vaswani initiated The Moment of Calm; a global peace initiative. World over, people observe two minutes of silence on 2 August (his birthday) and choose to forgive one and all. Spiritual Leaders, like Dalai Lama have spread the initiative.

== Death ==
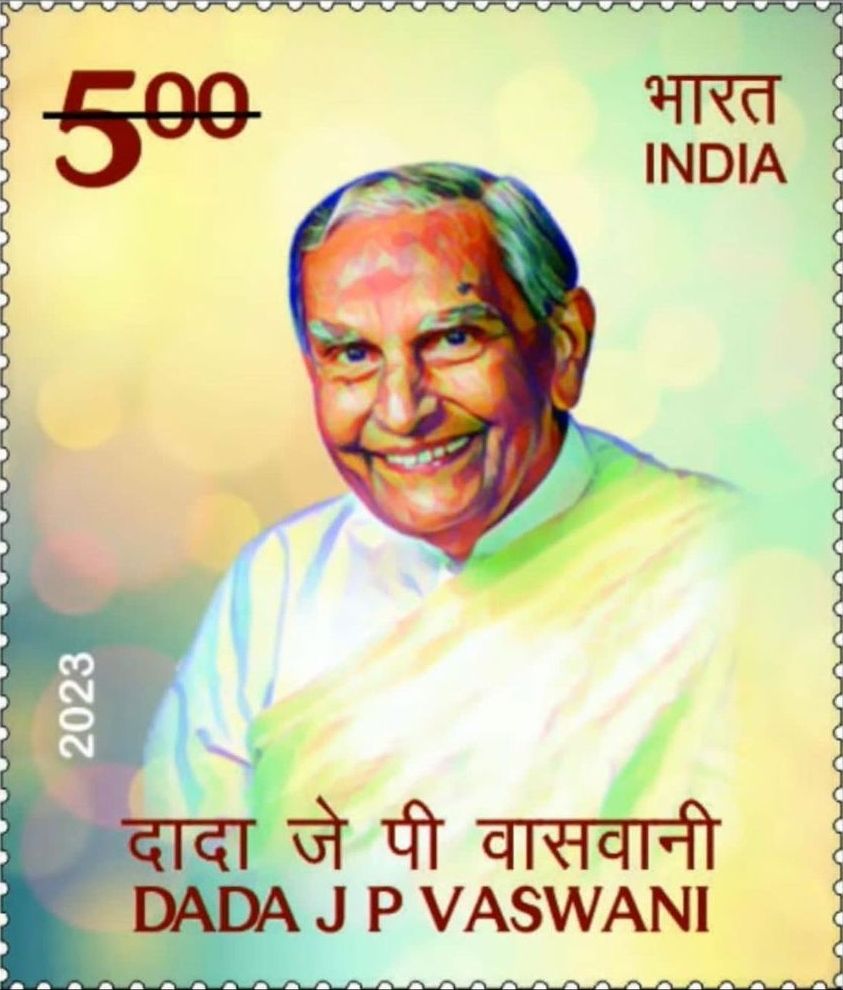
Vaswani on a 2023 stamp of India

Vaswani's health began to decline in May 2010, when at the age of 91, he fell and fractured his hip while playing ping-pong with children in Panama. He never fully recovered from the injury and primarily used a wheelchair the rest of his life. After several days in a Pune hospital for undisclosed ailments, Vaswani returned to his mission and died on 12 July 2018. He died three weeks shy of his 100th birthday.
