= Sadhu Vaswani =

Indian educationist

Sadhu T. L. Vaswani
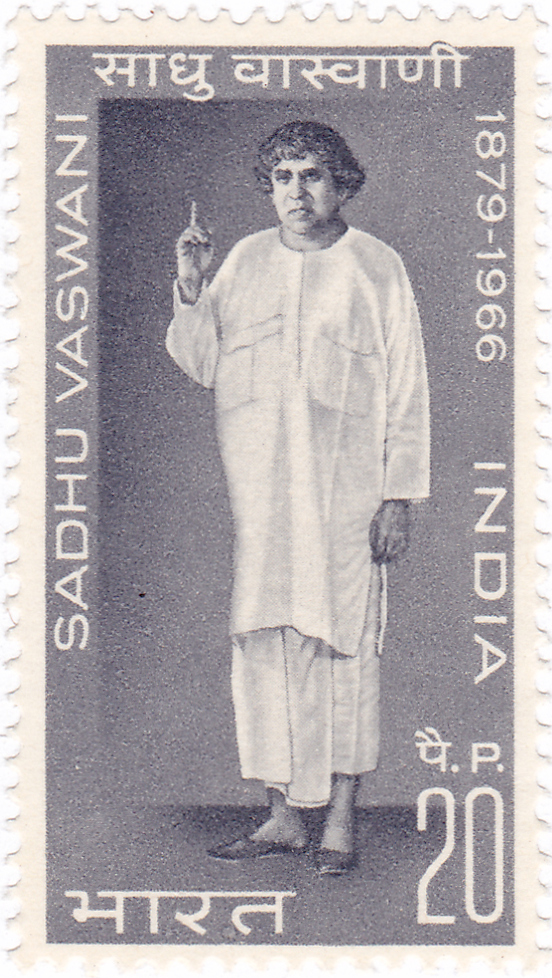

Personal life
- Born: Thanwardas Lilaram Vaswani; 25 November 1879 Hyderabad, Sindh, British India
- Died: 16 January 1966 (aged 86) Pune, Maharashtra, India
- Resting place: Sacred Samadhi at Sadhu Vaswani Mission, Pune, India
- Home town: Hyderabad, Sindh
- Spouse: Celibate
- Parent(s): Lilaram (Father), Varandevi (Mother)
- Pen name: NURI

Religious life
- Religion: Hinduism Follower of All Religion
- Institute: Sadhu Vaswani Mission
- Sect: Nonsectarian
- Profession: Spiritual Architect, Spiritual Inspiration for Many

Senior posting
- Teacher: Pramathalal Sen
- Successor: Dada Vaswani
- Reincarnation: Krishna

Sadhu Thanwardas Lilaram Vaswani (Sindhi: साधू थांवरदास लीलाराम वास्वाणी; Sādhū Thāṃvaradās Līlārām Vāsvāṇī) (25 November 1879 – 16 January 1966) was an Indian educationist who started the Mira Movement In Education and set up St. Mira's School in Hyderabad, Sindh, and later moved to Pune after 1949. A museum, Darshan Museum dedicated to his life and teaching was opened in Pune, in 2011.

== Early life and education ==
Sadhu Vaswani was born Thanwardas Lilaram Vaswani(Sindhi family), in Hyderabad Sindh. When he was a boy, he attended the Academy at Hyderabad-Sind. As a boy, he first learned about the sacred texts called the Upanishads from Brahmabandhav Upadhyay, a Brahmin from Bengal who adopted Christianity, but in 1907 he underwent prayashchitta (expression of reparation in Hindu custom) through a public ceremony to return into Hinduism, he died just two months later. Later in his lifetime, Sadhu Vaswani was recognized as an accomplished proponent of the Upanishads and a skilled interpreter of the Bible and the Qur'an.

He passed his Matriculation and completed his B.A. from the University of Bombay in 1899. After completing his B.A. examination, he received the Ellis Scholarship and became a Dakshina Fellow at D.J. Sind College in Karachi while studying for his master's degree. He received his M.A. degree also from the University of Bombay in 1902. He then asked his mother for permission to devote his life to the service of God and man. His mother desired that her son have success in life and would not agree. As a result, Vaswani agreed to take a teaching job at his alma mater, Union Academy. His mother sought to arrange a marriage for her son but Vaswani vowed to remain a brahmachari and never to marry. He soon accepted a position as Professor of History and Philosophy at Metropolitan College in Calcutta. There in Calcutta Vaswani found his guru, Sri Promotholal Sen, called Naluda.

== Career ==
After receiving his M.A. degree, at the age of 22, Vaswani took a job at Union Academy, his alma mater. After a few months, he accepted a position as a Professor of History and Philosophy at City College, Kolkata in 1903. In 1908 he moved to Karachi to join D. J. Science College as Professor of English and Philosophy, before participating in the Indian independence movement.

In July 1910, when Vaswani was 30 years old, he and his guru, Sri Promotholal Sen, sailed from Mumbai to Berlin. In August 1910, they participated in the Welt Congress or the World Congress of Religions in Berlin. Sadhu Vaswani spoke to the conference as a representative of India and expressed a message of peace, tranquility, the helping and healing of India, and Atman.

He was 40 years old when his mother died. He fulfilled his promise to her to work and make an income during her lifetime, but after her funeral he resigned his employment. In 1948, Vaswani reluctantly migrated to India from Sindh, which lay in the newly formed state of Pakistan. Prior to his exile, he and his followers had stirred controversy after prasad was distributed as usual at his weekly meeting that took place two days after the death of Pakistan's founder, Muhammad Ali Jinnah. The prasad ceremony was seen by local Muslims as an act to celebrate Jinnah's death.

He was an early supporter of Mahatma Gandhi's Non-Cooperation Movement. Upon his motion and under his influence the Sind Political Conference of the Indian National Congress passed a resolution regarding the Non-cooperation program. He wrote many books, which include: India Arisen; Awake, Young India!; India's Adventure; India in Chains; The Secret of Asia; My Motherland; Builders of Tomorrow; and Apostles of Freedom.

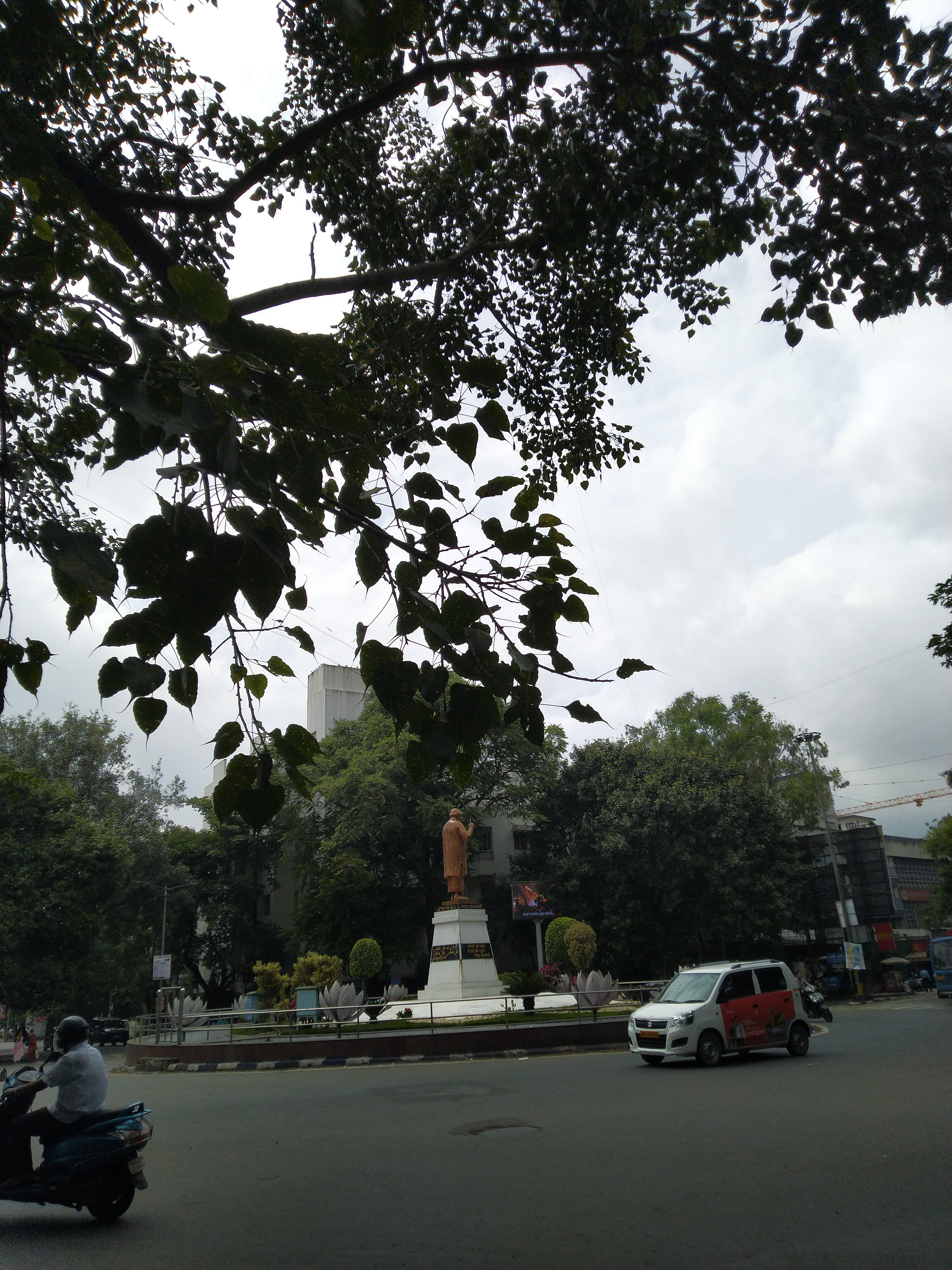
Sadhu Vaswani Circle, Pune at which busy arterial roads meets

Gurudeve Sadhu Vaswani said, "There are so many who can believe only one thing at a time. I am so made as to rejoice in the many and behold the beauty of the One in the many. Hence my natural affinity to many religions; in them all I see revelations of the One Spirit. And deep in my heart is the conviction that I am a servant of all prophets."

== Legacy ==
Annually, the Sadhu Vaswani Mission, which exists to take forward the life and mission of Sadhu T. L. Vaswani, celebrates the International Meatless Day on Vaswani's birthday, 25 November, because he had strongly advocated universal practice of vegetarian living. This is celebrated widely wherever Vaswani's heritage is recalled.

== Awards and recognition ==
- The Government of India issued a postage stamp in his honour.
- Darshan Museum Pune is a biographical museum that is based on his life.
