= Manohar Balaji Sarwate =

Indian engineer

Secretary-General of the ITU
- In office 1 October 1965 – 19 February 1967
- Preceded by: Gerald C. Gross
- Succeeded by: Mohamed Ezzedine Mili

Personal details
- Born: 15 March 1910
- Died: 19 February 1967 (aged 56)
- Education: Bombay University, India; Liverpool University, United Kingdom

Military service
- Battles/wars: World War II

Manohar Balaji Sarwate (15 March 1910 – 19 February 1967), was an Indian engineer who served as the Secretary-General of the International Telecommunication Union from 1965 until his death in 1967. He had previously served as the first ITU Deputy Secretary-General, for five years from 1960.

== Education ==
Sarwate was a Bachelor of Science in physics and mathematics from the Bombay University and completed a diploma in Electrical Technology from the Indian Institute of Science. He then moved to the United Kingdom and obtained a doctorate in radio engineering from the Liverpool University in 1938.

== Career ==
Sarwate was engaged in the research and development of aircraft radio and radar equipment for the Royal Aircraft Establishment in the United Kingdom from 1938 to 1941. He was commissioned into the Technical (Signals) branch of the Royal Indian Air Force on 19 December 1941. He continued his work on radar, rose to the rank of Squadron Leader, and was mentioned in dispatches in October 1945. He retired from service in October 1946.

He worked for the Civil Aviation Administration of the Government of India from 1946 to 1953, serving as director of communication responsible for the development of the aeronautical commercial services from 1948. In 1953, he was appointed as an adviser for Wireless Planning and Coordination in the Ministry of Transportation and Communication. In this position, he was responsible for national and international wireless planning and coordination. From 1953, he served as the Chairman of the Indian government's Radio and Cable Board.

He was a founding member of the Institution of Telecommunication Engineers of India, of which he was elected a Fellow in 1961. He was also a Member of the Aeronautical Society of India and of the Institution of Electrical Engineers, London.

== International Telecommunication Union ==
Sarwate was the Alternate Leader of the Indian delegation to the 1959 ITU Plenipotentiary Conference in Geneva and was elected as the first ITU Deputy Secretary-General, a post created by the consolidation of the two Assistant Secretaries-General. He was the first elected ITU Deputy Secretary-General instead of being appointed by the ITU's Administrative Council.

Sarwate was subsequently elected Secretary-General in 1965 by the Plenipotentiary Conference in Montreux. As Secretary-General, he had a strong interest in telecommunication development and visited developing countries to promote technical cooperation. He was also keen to see efficiency and economy in the work of ITU. He is said to have told a colleague: "So long as there are starving people in the world we cannot commit Members of the Union to expenses which are not absolutely essential."

He died in office in February 1967 during a critical surgery.

Preceded by Gerald C. Gross	Secretary-General of the ITU; 1965–1967	Succeeded by Mohamed Ezzedine Mili
