= IEEE Honorary Membership =

IEEE Honorary Membership is an honorary type of membership of the Institute of Electrical and Electronics Engineers (IEEE), that is given for life to an individual. It is awarded by the board of directors of IEEE to people 'who have rendered meritorious service to humanity in [the] IEEE's designated fields of interest' while not being members of IEEE.

This membership provides all the rights and privileges of a normal IEEE membership, except the right to hold an IEEE office.

The recipients of this grade will receive a certificate, an 'Honorary Member' pin and a crystal sculpture.

In a given year, if the IEEE Medal of Honor recipient is not an IEEE member, they will be automatically recommended to the IEEE Board of Directors for IEEE Honorary Membership.

== Recipients ==
The following people received the IEEE Honorary Membership:

- 2023: Donna Strickland
- 2022: Calyampudi Radhakrishna Rao
- 2021: Edward C. Stone
- 2020: Borys Paton
- 2019: Telle Whitney
- 2018: Mihal (Mike) Lazaridis
- 2018: Anton Zeilinger
- 2017: Sir James Dyson
- 2016: Serge Haroche
- 2015: Elon Musk
- 2014: Shirley M. Tilghman
- 2013: No award
- 2012: Yoshio Utsumi
- 2011: Wang Jianzhou
- 2011: A. P. J. Abdul Kalam
- 2010: N. R. Narayana Murthy
- 2009: Gerald Posakony
- 2008: Jong Yong Yun
- 2007: Tsutae Shinoda
- 2007: Ian C. McRae
- 2006: Vladimir Rokhlin
- 2005: Dean Kamen
- 2004: No Award
- 2003: Tadashi Sasaki
- 2003: Jorma Ollila
- 2002: James C. Morgan
- 2001: Charles M. Geschke
- 2000: Norio Ohga
- 1999: No Award
- 1998: Pavaguda V. Indiresan
- 1998: Sheila E. Widnall
- 1997: Pekka J. Tarjanne
- 1996: Hiroyuki Mizuno
- 1996: Leon M. Lederman
- 1995: Lars Henry Ramquist
- 1994: Michael Carpenter
- 1994: Ralph E. Gomory
- 1993: Robert W. Galvin
- 1992: Mark Krivocheev
- 1991: Akio Morita
- 1990: No Award
- 1989: No Award
- 1988: Luis Alvarez
- 1987: Gene H. Golub
- 1987: Arno A. Penzias
- 1986: Arthur E. Bryson
- 1985: Hideo Yamashita
- 1984: M. G. K. Menon
- 1984: Herbert A. Simon
- 1983: Norman Ramsey
- 1983: George B. Dantzig
- 1983: Cecil H. Green
- 1982: Wolfgang K. H. Panofsky
- 1982: Donald E. Knuth
- 1982: Brian D. Josephson
- 1981: Walter H. Brattain
- 1981: John Bardeen
- 1981: Edwin H. Land
