= Pekka Tarjanne =

Finnish scientist and politician (1937–2010)

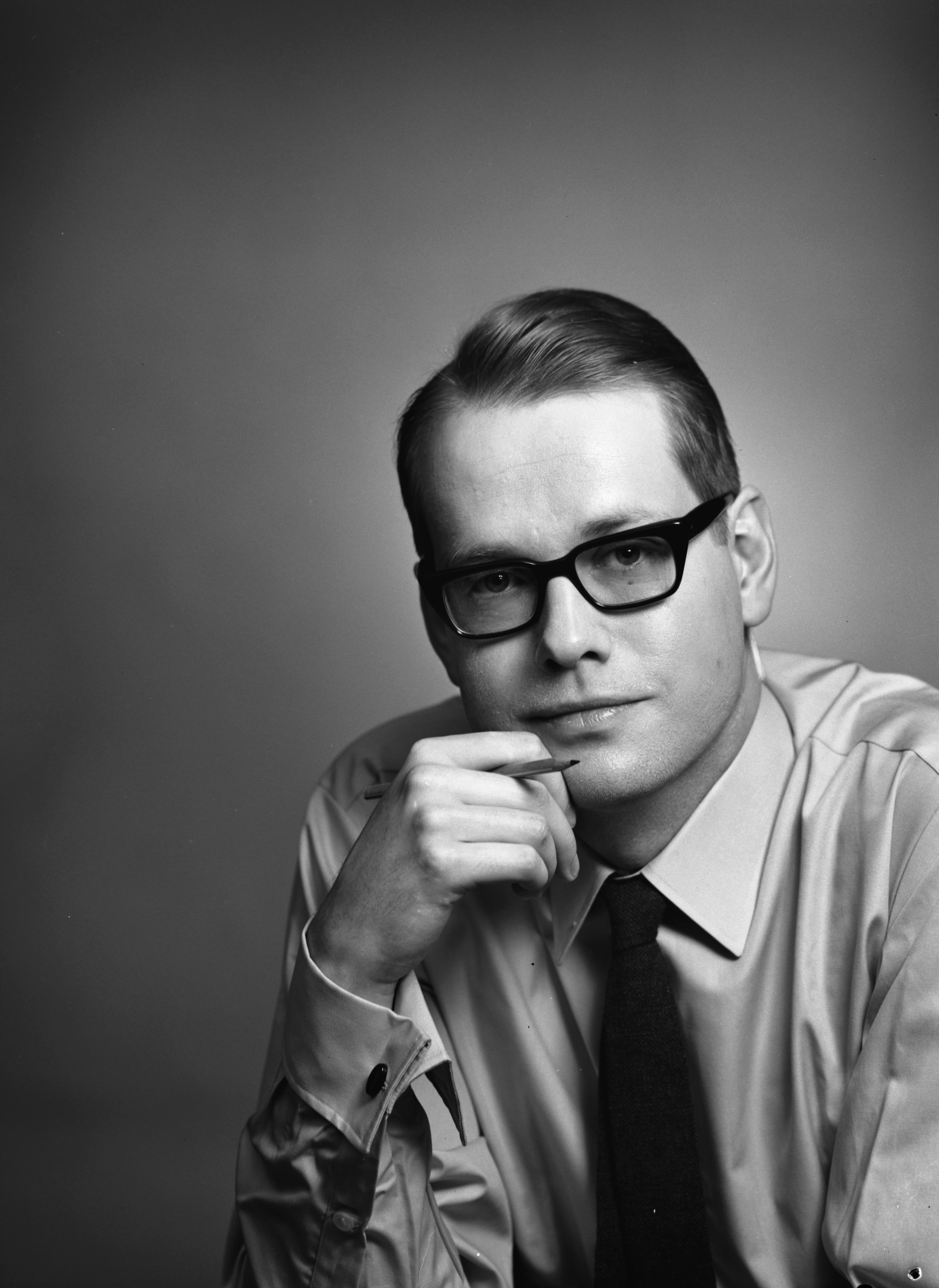
- Tarjanne in 1970

Secretary General International Telecommunication Union
- In office 1 November 1989 – 31 January 1999
- Preceded by: Richard E. Butler
- Succeeded by: Yoshio Utsumi

Chairman of the Liberal People's Party
- In office 1968–1978

Minister of Transport and Communications
- In office 4 September 1972 – 12 June 1975
- Prime Minister: Kalevi Sorsa

Personal details
- Born: Pekka Johannes Tarjanne; 19 September 1937 Stockholm, Sweden
- Died: 24 February 2010 (aged 72) Hattula, Finland
- Party: Liberal People's Party
- Spouse: Aino Tarjanne
- Education: Helsinki University of Technology

Pekka Tarjanne (1937–2010) was a scientist and politician who served as the chairman of the Liberal Party and minister of transport in Finland. He also headed the International Telecommunication Union from 1989 and 1999.

== Early life and education ==
Tarjanne was born in Stockholm, Sweden, on 19 September 1937. His grandfather was one of the founders of the Liberal Party and served as the minister of interior.

In 1960 Tarjanne obtained his master of science degree in engineering and a PhD degree in technology from Helsinki University of Technology at age 24.

== Career ==
Tarjanne carried out research and teaching in Denmark and the United States and returned to Finland in 1965. He was promoted to the professorship in theoretical physics at the University of Oulu. From 1967 he worked as a professor in the same field at the University of Helsinki. He served as the chairman of the Liberal Party from 1968 to 1978. He became one of the youngest party leaders on record when he was elected to the post.

On 23 March 1970 Tarjanne was elected to the Finnish Parliament where he served until 20 September 1977. He was the minister of transport and communications and the state minister responsible for Nordic cooperation between 4 September 1972 and 12 June 1975 in the cabinet led by Prime Minister Kalevi Sorsa. In 1977 Tarjanne was appointed director-general of posts and telecommunications which he held until 1989. In 1989 he was elected secretary-general of the International Telecommunication Union in the conference held in Nice, France. He replaced Richard E. Butler in the post. Tarjanne was re-elected to the same post in the conference in Kyoto, Japan, in 1994 and held the post until 1999. His successor as the secretary-general of the International Telecommunication Union was Yoshio Utsumi.

He was the deputy CEO of a Bermuda-based company, Project Oxygen Ltd between 1999 and 2000. Tarjanne also served as the special advisor to the Secretary-General of the United Nations on information and communication technologies at the beginning of the 2000s. As of 2003 and 2004 he was professor at the Academy of Technology and the chair of the eight-member International Award Selection Committee.

== Personal life and death ==
Tarjanne was married. He died in Hattula on 24 February 2010.

=== Recognition ===
Tarjanne and his wife, Aino, were named by Geneva State Council as the honorary citizens for their "major contribution to enhancing Geneva's reputation as an international centre".

Preceded by Richard E. Butler	Secretary-General of the ITU; 1989–1999	Succeeded by Yoshio Utsumi
