= Yoshio Utsumi =

Japanese diplomat (born 1942)

- Born: August 14, 1942
- Education: Political Science
- Alma mater: University of Tokyo; University of Chicago
- Awards: The Grand Cordon of the Order of the Sacred Treasure (2013); IEEE Honorary Membership (2015)

Secretary General of International Telecommunication Union
- In office 1 February 1999 – 31 December 2006
- Preceded by: Pekka Tarjanne
- Succeeded by: Hamadoun Touré

Yoshio Utsumi (内海 善雄, Utsumi Yoshio; born August 14, 1942) was the Secretary-General of the International Telecommunication Union (ITU) from 1998 to 2006.

== Early life and education ==
Yoshio Utsumi was born in 1942 in Takamatsu, a city in Kagawa Prefecture on the Japanese island of Shikoku. He obtained a Bachelor in Law degree from the University of Tokyo in 1965, and a Master of Arts in Political Science degree from the University of Chicago in 1972.

He is married to his wife Masako, an architect. They have a son and a daughter.

== Career ==
Utsumi worked for the Japanese Ministry of Posts and Telecommunications in various high level posts, including helping liberalize Japan's telecommunications market, serving as director-general of the ministry, and serving as first secretary of the Japanese mission to the ITU for 3 years, before he moved to the post of ITU secretary-general in 1998.

=== International Telecommunication Union ===
Utsumi had already contributed to the ITU before joining the organisation. He spent three years, from 1978 onward, as First Secretary of the Permanent Mission of Japan in charge of ITU affairs in Geneva, elected as its Chairman at the 1994 ITU Plenipotentiary Conference was held in Kyoto where he witnessed the approval of a Japanese proposal for the creation of the ITU's World Telecommunication Policy Forum (WTPF).

In 1998, Utsumi was elected as ITU Secretary-General at the Plenipotentiary Conference in Minneapolis. He was elected for a second term at the 2002 conference in Marrakesh. He was not a candidate for reelection in 2006 as the ITU rules do permit more than 2 consecutive periods as secretary-general. His tenure was marked by achieving significant cost-savings within the organisation and the organisation of the United Nations' World Summit on the Information Society (WSIS), whose first gathering took place in two phases, in Geneva in 2003 and Tunis in 2005 and involved more than 30,000 attendees, including around one hundred Heads of State and Government.

Utsumi introduced measures that led to a nineteen-percent increase in private sector membership of ITU.

== Awards and honors ==
In April 2013 he was awarded The Grand Cordon of the Order of the Sacred Treasure in recognition of his achievements.

Awarded IEEE Honorary Membership, 2015

Preceded by Pekka Tarjanne	Secretary-General of the ITU; 1999–2006	Succeeded by Hamadoun Touré
