= Lake Zurich Swim =

Swimming marathon race

Coordinates: 47.227690°N 8.812953°E

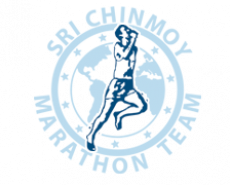
- Host city: Zurich, Switzerland
- Date: August
- Venue: Open water Lake Zurich
- Events: 16.16 miles (26.01 km)

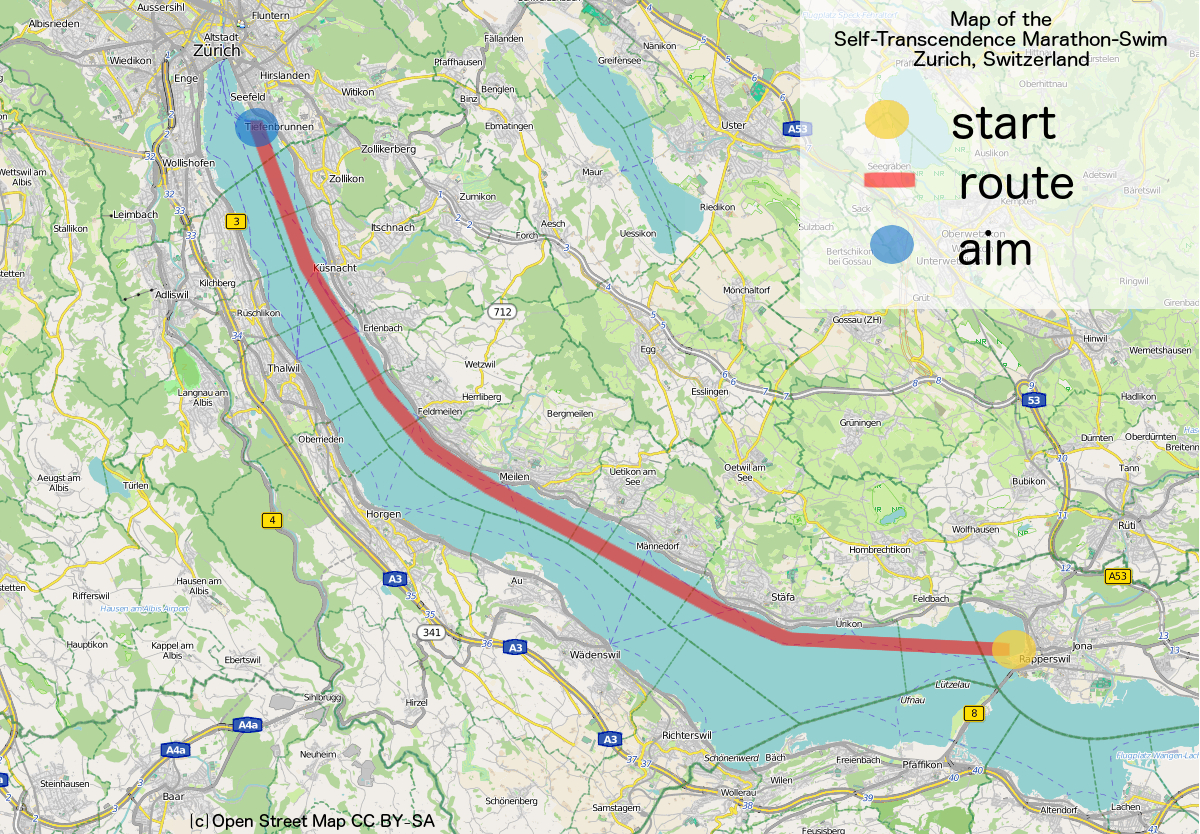
Map

The Lake Zurich Marathon Swim belongs to the world's longest swimming marathon races. It is held annually in August and is organized by the Sri Chinmoy Marathon Team.

The participants swim from Rapperswil to Zurich, with a total course length of 16.16 miles (26.01 km).

== Winner's list ==
Winner's list, overall non-wetsuit (Race record highlighted)

Year	Men			Women		
Year	Country	Swimmer	Time (hours, minutes, seconds)	Country	Swimmer	Time (hours, minutes, seconds)
1987	United Kingdom	Lyndon Dunsbee	06:15:02	Switzerland	Bridet Young	06:35:20
1988	Egypt	Mahmond Nail	06:38:40	India	Archana Patel	09:51:20
1989	Poland	Bogusław Lizak	09:09:48	Switzerland	Monika Glaner	09:42:31
1990	Germany	Christoph Wandratsch	06:15:20	Australia	Tammy van Wisse	06:42:19
1991	Czech Republic	Michal Spacek	06:39:45	Czech Republic	Ilona Musalkova	07:40:28
1992	Netherlands	Erik von Dartel	06:19:14	Czech Republic	Lenka Sterbova	07:09:18
1993	Egypt	Mohammed Maarouf	05:51:41	Switzerland	Karin Bolliger	11:56:10
1994	Egypt	Tamer Ibrahim Ali	05:57:40	Australia	Susie Maroney	06:00:07
1995	Switzerland	Christian Narra	05:53:21	Switzerland	Pamela Kalas	06:12:08
1996	Switzerland	David Zanfino	07:24:25	Czech Republic	Lenka Lockerova	07:48:30
1997	—	—	—	—	—	—
1998	India	Sandeep Verma	06:37:20	Sweden	Eva Andersson	07:45:29
1999	—	—	—	—	—	—
2000	United Kingdom	Simon Lee	07:07:00	Argentina	Petti Noelia	07:27:37
2001	Switzerland	Michele Silvan	06:06:55	Switzerland	Nadia Krüger	05:59:43
2002	United Kingdom	Simon Lee	07:11:52	Sweden	Eva Andersson	08:25:21
2003	Ecuador	Santiago Palacios	06:50:42	South Africa	Amanada Picard	06:48:12
2004	Switzerland	Mario Guhl	07:30:47	Sweden	Eva Andersson	08:37:59
2005	Switzerland	Toni Pavičić-Donkić	06:41:08	Germany	Sandra Albrecht	07:26:41
2006	Switzerland	Jürg Schmid	07:10:23	United States	Tina Neill	08:02:02
2007	Czech Republic	David Cech	06:53:50	United Kingdom	Nancy Douglas	07:07:05
2008	Switzerland	Jürg Schmid	06:53:23	Germany	Margit Bohnhoff	08:05:03
2009	United Kingdom	Lee Portingale	07:15:07	Germany	Christiane Vendel	07:43:29
2010	Australia	Barry Sorcha	07:17:05	United States	Julie Ann Galloway	06:35:41
2011	Italy	Thomas Ladurner	06:54:45	United Kingdom	Elizabeth Price	08:25:41
2012	Switzerland	Bruno Baumgartner	07:33:45	United Kingdom	Alexandra Hardy	07:30:56
2013	Australia	Oliver Wilkinson	06:56:36	United States	Patti Bauernfeind	07:53:34
2014	Italy	Marco Allegretti	06:19:41	Ireland	Rachael Lee	07:02:15
2015	United States	John Zemaitis	07:40:23	United Kingdom	Jo Yetman	08:21:31
2016	Switzerland	Til Mesmer	06:35:35	Australia	Georgina Kovacs	06:59:31
2017	Romania	Paul Eugen Dorin Georgescu	07:11:37	United Kingdom	Jenny Zwijnen	07:44:52
2018	South Africa	Tyronn Venter	06:36:59	Germany	Sandra Hornig	07:39:04
2019	Bulgaria	Dimitar Videnov	06:31:09	Germany	Sandra Hornig	06:51:31
2020	—	—	—	—	—	—
2021	Germany	Stefan Runge	08: 08:32	Germany	Martina Junger	08:11:50
