= Pavaguda V. Indiresan =

Indian academic (1928–2013)

- Born: 1928
- Died: 2013 (aged 84–85)
- Education: University of Birmingham
- Known for: Director of Indian Institute of Technology
- Awards: Honorary Member of IEEE (1988); Padma Bhushan award (2000)
- Scientific career
- Notable students: Avinash Kak Subhash Kak Arogyaswami Paulraj

Pavagada Venkata Indiresan (1928–2013) was an Indian engineer, educationist, and administrator. He served as Director of the Indian Institute of Technology (IIT) in Madras during 1979-1984. He was professor at IIT Delhi during 1965-1979 and 1987-1993.

He did his Ph.D. from the University of Birmingham.

He served as president, Indian National Academy of Engineering, New Delhi, India. He was named an Honorary Member of IEEE in 1998 "for contributions to the growth of electrical engineering in India through his leadership in education, applied research and professional engineering institutions."

He was the Ph.D. supervisor of Avinash Kak, Subhash Kak, and Arogyaswami Paulraj.

He received the Padma Bhushan award in 2000.

He challenged in court the Government of India's decision to reserve seats in the IITs for Other Backward Classes in central educational institutions under the Central Educational Institutions (Reservation in Admission) Act, 2006 For many years he wrote a column on science and technology for The Hindu's Businessline.
