= Mohamed Ezzedine Mili =

Tunisian diplomat

Secretary-General of the ITU
- In office 20 February 1967 – 31 December 1982
- Preceded by: Manohar Balaji Sarwate
- Succeeded by: Richard E. Butler

Personal details
- Education: Ecole Normale Supérieure, France; Ecole Nationale Supérieure des Télécommunications, France

Mohamed Ezzedine Mili (4 December 1917 – 5 August 2013) was a Tunisian diplomat who served as the Secretary-General of the International Telecommunication Union from 1967 to 1982, including an ad interim tenure from 1967 to 1973.

== Early life ==
Mili was born in Djemmal, Tunisia, on 4 December 1917.

== Career ==
Mili studied in France at the École Normale Supérieure (Saint-Cloud) and the École Nationale Supérieure des Télécommunications (Paris), graduating as a telecommunications engineer in 1946. He joined the Tunisian Posts and Telecommunications (PTT) Administration in 1948. In 1957, he was promoted to Chief Engineer and took up his duties as Director-General of Telecommunications at the Ministry of PTT. In that capacity, he modernized the Tunisian telephone network by introducing the automatic crossbar-type system.

From 1956, Mili led the Tunisian delegation at many of ITU’s major events, including the Plenipotentiary Conferences of 1959 and 1965, the Plenary Assemblies of the International Telephone and Telegraph Consultative Committee (CCITT) of 1958, 1960 and 1964, and the Plenary Assembly of the International Radio Consultative Committee (CCIR) in 1963. He was also active in several CCITT study groups, notably those that dealt with telephone switching and signalling and the worldwide automatic and semi-automatic telephone network, and in CCIR study groups in the areas of space systems and radio astronomy and radio-relay systems. Mili was actively involved in the work of the World Plan Committee, which was responsible for planning the world telecommunication network. In 1961, he was elected Vice-Chairman of the Plan Committee for Africa and became its Chairman in 1964. From 1960 to 1965, Mili represented Tunisia on the ITU Administrative Council and was elected Chairman of its 19th Session in 1964.

== ITU Secretary-General ==
In 1965, Mili was elected Deputy Secretary-General of the ITU at the Plenipotentiary Conference in Montreux, Switzerland. He took up the duties of Secretary-General on 20 February 1967 following the death of the then Secretary-General, Manohar Balaji Sarwate. Mili was elected Secretary-General of ITU at the subsequent Plenipotentiary Conference in Malaga-Torremolinos, Spain, in 1973, and served in this position until 31 December 1982. His 16-year tenure as Secretary-General, the longest tenure in ITU history, was dedicated to addressing the needs of developing countries.

For this purpose, he created the Department of Technical Cooperation to help these countries improve their telecommunication infrastructure and networks. The Department of Technical Cooperation coordinated its work with the United Nations Development Programme to that end. Through the Administrative Council (now simply known as the Council), he initiated the establishment of World Telecommunication Day, the first of which was celebrated on 17 May 1968. ITU continues that celebration with World Telecommunication and Information Society Day.

=== World Telecommunications Exhibitions ===
Mili also initiated the creation of World Telecommunication Exhibitions. Initially held every four years — hence the name the ”Olympics of telecommunications” — these exhibitions grew to become the largest telecommunication events in the world, providing a global showcase for the latest technologies, news and views. The first exhibition, TELECOM 71, held in Geneva, Switzerland with the theme "Message to the XXIst Century" featured technical symposia, an international film festival "The Golden Antenna", and an international competition "Youth in the Electronic Age." At TELECOM 71 he said: ”All those who had the opportunity — and the good fortune — to visit the various stands were able to appreciate the fundamental role played by ITU in the spectacular evolution of telecommunication techniques and in the rapid expansion of the world network to which it has made such a large contribution.”

As noted in the ITU Telecom World Timeline (ITU News, October 2012), ”This was the first time that an exhibition with such a vast range of telecommunication equipment had been organized on a world scale with the participation of administrations of ITU member countries, private companies and industrial firms. Spacecraft and satellites occupied a prominent place. Satellites used for public telecommunications, meteorology, mass education or radio-navigation were to be seen alongside models of different types of earth stations.”

Mili’s enthusiasm was palpable at all the three events he led: TELECOM 71, TELECOM 75 and TELECOM 79.

== Death ==
Mili died on 5 August 2013 aged 95.

Preceded by Manohar Balaji Sarwate	Secretary-General of the ITU; 1967–1982	Succeeded by Richard E. Butler
