= Hell Ride, Melbourne =

The Hell Ride, also known as the Hell Dog, is an informal group bicycle training ride that follows the coastline of Port Phillip Bay through the south–eastern suburbs of Melbourne, Victoria, Australia. It meets at 7am on Saturdays at the Black Rock clock tower, Black Rock and heads south towards Mount Eliza along Beach Road.

The record for the fastest Hell Ride is currently held by Oskar von Wyss (NSTRMO), according to Strava, with a time of 1 hour, 18 minutes, and 22 seconds, set on 3 January 2026.

The ride has been widely criticised, particularly after the death of pedestrian James Gould in August, 2006.

Following the Victorian State Coroner's investigation into the death of Gould, after a cyclist from the Hellride bunch failed to stop at a pedestrian crossing when the traffic light was red and collided with him, a review of the literature on cyclists who ride in large groups or bunches on public roads was commissioned. The research was released by Monash University Accident Research Centre in January 2009.

The 2006 fatality, along with other incidents involving cyclists, has led to the introduction of new "culpable cycling" laws by the Victorian State Government. The Road Legislation Amendment Bill 2009 introduces new penalties for cyclists who cause death or injury in a collision, for failing to stop and render assistance and for "dangerous and careless riding".

== See also ==
- Cycling in Victoria
