= Richard E. Butler =

Australian federal public servant

Secretary-General of the ITU
- In office 1 January 1983 – 31 October 1989
- Preceded by: Mohamed Ezzedine Mili
- Succeeded by: Pekka Tarjanne

Personal details
- Born: 1926 Black Rock, Victoria
- Died: 25 June 2012 (aged 85–86)

Military service
- Battles/wars: World War II

Richard E. Butler (1926 – 25 June 2012) was an Australian public servant who was the secretary-general of the International Telecommunication Union from 1983 to 1989. He was also its deputy secretary-general from 1974 to 1982, and in an ad interim tenure from 1968 to 1973.

== Early life ==
Butler was born in Black Rock, Melbourne, Australia in 1926.

== Career ==
He enlisted in the Australian Army, aged 18, and served during the Second World War. After the war, he returned to work for the Postmaster-General's Department, where he had been employed before as a delivery boy. He progressed to become assistant deputy director-general, where he was involved in planning domestic and international telecommunications, and was a policy adviser for the development of Australian broadcasting and television services. He also helped to establish INTELSAT and assisted in negotiating international agreements on submarine cables.

=== International Telecommunication Union ===
Butler participated in major ITU conferences as deputy leader of Australian delegations. In 1968, he was appointed by the ITU Administrative Council to be deputy secretary-general ad interim, and was elected to the post by the Plenipotentiary Conference in Malaga-Torremolinos in 1973.

The 1982 ITU Plenipotentiary Conference in Nairobi elected Butler as its secretary-general. The conference also set up an Independent International Commission for World-Wide Telecommunications Development, chaired by Sir Donald Maitland, which in 1985 produced a highly influential report, The Missing Link, that found that two-third's of the world's population had no access to telephone services and set a goal for bringing all of humankind within easy reach of telecommunications and its benefits by the early part of the 21st century. The Plenipotentiary Conference in Nice in 1989 followed this up by creating within ITU a Telecommunication Development Bureau. Butler's tenure also saw the signing of the International Telecommunication Regulations (ITRs) in 1988, which facilitated connectivity of, and innovation in, international telecommunication services.

He retired from the ITU in 1989 but remained involved in its activities. On his retirement, John J O'Neill, a US representative on the ITU's Administrative Council wrote, "the international telecommunications community must insist on (Butler's) continued participation as an elder statesman. His talents are too great, his understanding of the issues too profound, his negotiating and conciliatory skills too impressive to remain unused." Butler's successor as general secretary of the ITU was Pekka Tarjanne.

He was also on a number of boards, including chairman of Worldspace-Asia, a company related to Worldspace, that was set up to deliver digital radio from satellite to developing nations and remote areas, and the board of Sky Station Australia, a company that planned to provide broadband communications from a network of tethered airships.

== Death ==
Butler died in Melbourne in 2012 at the age of 86. In a statement of condolences to his friends and family, the Australian communications minister Stephen Conroy said, "Dick helped shape the telecommunications industry we know today. In the decades following his leadership of the ITU, he continued to make a substantial contribution. As recently as this year, Dick was an honoured member of Australia's delegation to the World Radiocommunication Conference... For over 30 years he has mentored many individuals both from Australia and around the world. He will be missed by all."

Preceded by Mohamed Ezzedine Mili	Secretary-General of the ITU; 1983–1989	Succeeded by Pekka Tarjanne
