= John Van Wisse =

Australian swimmer and coach

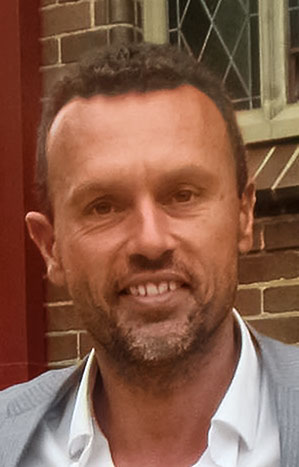

Personal details
- Profession: Swimmer

John Van Wisse (born 1972 or 1973) is a veteran Australian swimmer and swimming coach. He has been swimming since at least the 1990s. Van Wisse set a record when he ran, swam and cycled from London to Paris.

== Swimming ==
Van Wisse swims to raise money for charity. Van Wisse started training at the Brighton swimming Baths when he was a teenager. Dawn Fraser is someone Van Wisse says he credits to for his endurance. Van Wisse trained the youngest swimmer to swim the triple crown Dan Canta.

British-Australian comedian David Brooks created a movie Crossing the Line: John van Wisse about Van Wisse's 483 km (300 mi) record-breaking Arch 2 Arc ultra-triathlon in August 2014.

== Personal life ==
Van Wisse is the brother of fellow long-distance swimmer Tammy van Wisse.
