= Chinmoy Barma =

Indian filmmaker

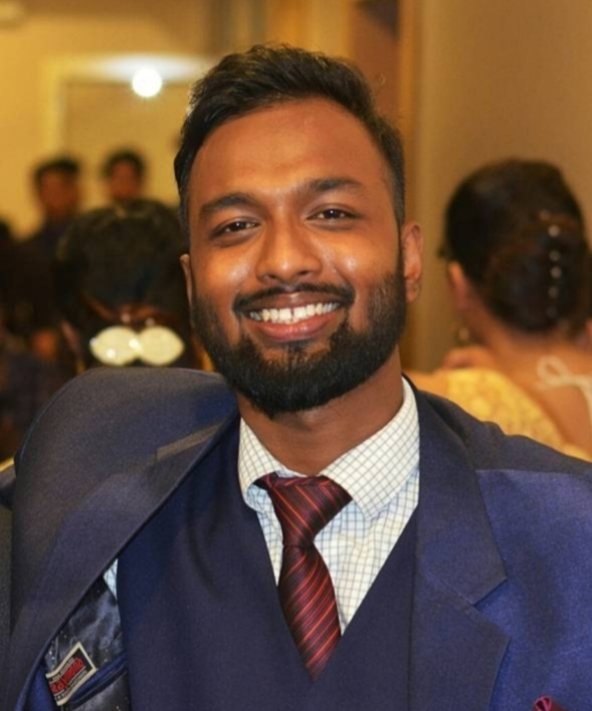
- Born: Nalbari, Assam, India
- Education: Mechanical Engineering
- Alma mater: Cotton College
- Occupation: Filmmaker
- Awards: Best Director Award at 2 11 17 International Film Festival, Best Indian Film Director Award at 4th West Bengal Short Film Festival 2025, Inspiring Youth Enterprise Award - Filmmaking at the Global Leaders Awards, Kazakhstan.

Chinmoy Barma is an Indian filmmaker and visual artist, recognized for his academic achievements and dedication to social causes in his films.

== Early life and education ==
Born in Nalbari, Barma achieved the 7th rank in the HSLC (High School Leaving Certificate) examination conducted by the Secondary Education Board of Assam (SEBA). He is the son of Anju Baruah Barmah and Maheswar Barmah - a State Award winning teacher. He pursued higher education at Cotton College and later completed his engineering degree from Assam Science and Technology University.

== Career ==
After finishing his studies, Barma spent a year working in Delhi, alongside he joined an NGO as a city lead, which focuses on providing support and resources to those in need. His advocacy for children's rights garnered appreciation, alongside his short films which portray the folklore and culture of his home state of Assam. Over the years, he has created over nine short films that explore the beliefs and stories of people from the Northeastern part of India, aiming to preserve and share their rich cultural heritage. He craft films that enlighten, become catalysts for dialogue and social reflection, and provoke critical thinking.

In 2023, Barma created images of ghosts and other popular legends from Assamese folklore using artificial intelligence, which gained significant popularity on social media, even receiving worldwide attention. Later, he served in the Crime Branch (Assam Police), Home and Political Department of Government of Assam. He is currently posted at the Legislative Department, Assam Secretariat, Dispur and volunteers for Robinhood Army.

He also writes editorials and opinion pieces for leading Assamese and regional newspapers, including The Assam Tribune, Sentinel Assam and G Plus, among others.

== Research papers on Barma's works ==
Barma’s work has also attracted academic attention. Two research papers analysing his films were published in Drishti: The Sight (Vol. XII, Issue II, November 2023–April 2024), a UGC CARE–listed journal, named “Revisiting Assamese Ghostlore through Films: A Study of Chinmoy Barma’s Ghorapak and Jokhini” and “Exploring the Uncanny in Assamese Folklore”. In addition, a paper titled “Rivers and Lores: A Study of Select Myths and Legends of Assam and Bengal” was presented at the Indira Gandhi National Centre for the Arts (IGNCA), New Delhi, during the 5th Nadi Utsav in September 2024.

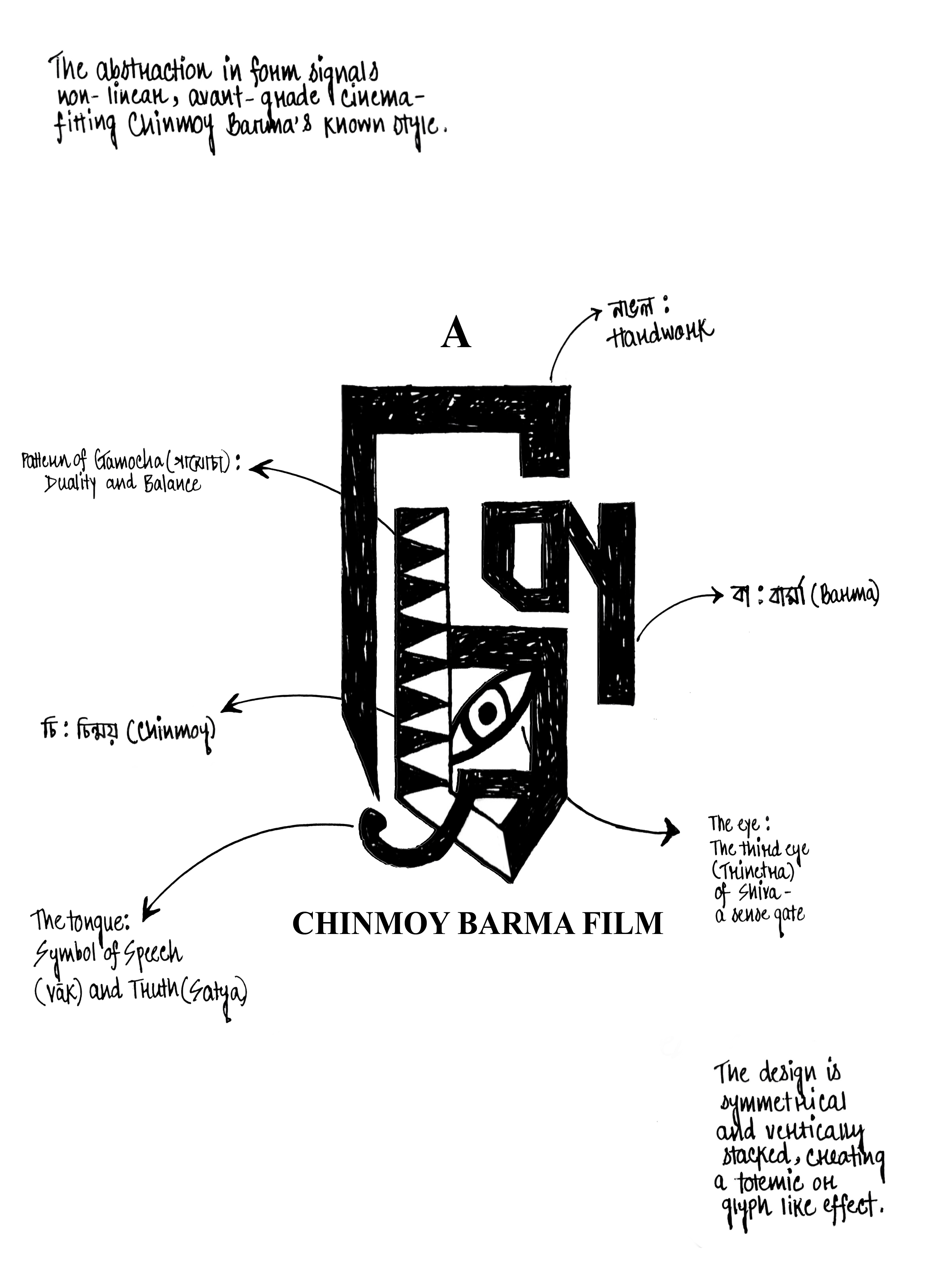
Chinmoy Barma Films Logo

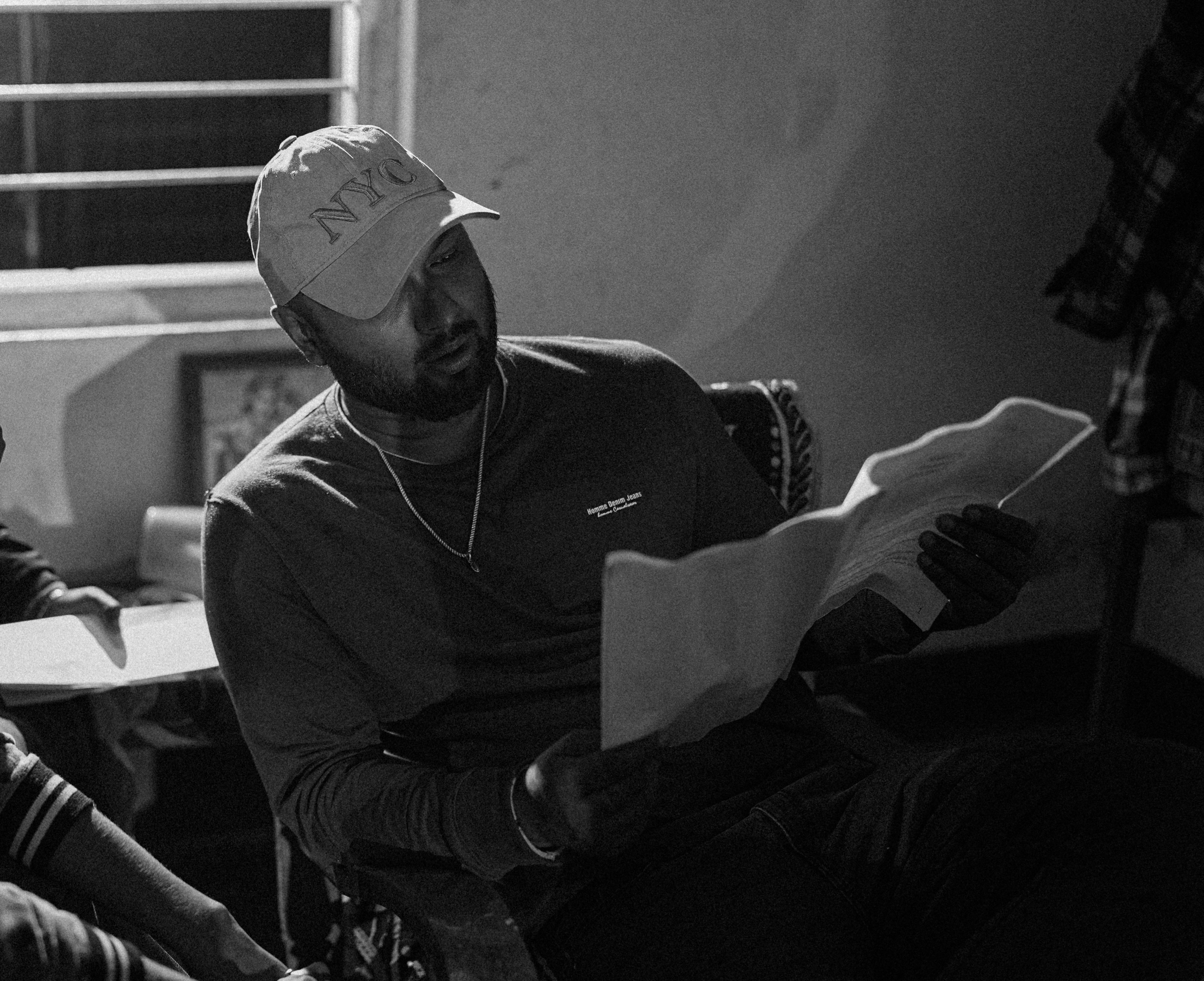
Chinmoy Barma from the set of Jokhini

== Works ==
=== Short films ===
No	Name	Year	Source
1	Xaathor	2016	
2	Morome Ringiyai	2019	
3	Ghorapak	2020	
4	Jokhini	2022	
5	Aham	2022	
6	Tezor Tukura	2023	
7	Ahalya	2023	
10	Narakasur	2024	
12	Khiriki	2024	

== Awards & Recognition ==
Barma's short film "Ahalya" won the Best Silent Film Award at the recent Indo-French International Film Festival. He received 'Inspiring Youth Enterprise Award - Filmmaking' at the Global Leaders Awards, Kazakhstan in recognition of his efforts in promoting Assamese folklore through his innovative films. He was awarded 'The Best Director' award at 2 11 17 International Film Festival and the 'Best Indian Film Director' award at the West Bengal Short Film Festival 2025.

His films have won awards at several international platforms, including the Indo-French Film Festival, 2 11 17 International Film Festival, Sittannavasal International Film Festival (where he also won Best Experimental Film, 2025), and the Indian International Short Film Festival, along with a Jury Appreciation Award at the Durgapur International Film Festival 2025.

In addition, his works have been officially selected at numerous prestigious festivals such as the China Dragon Awards 2024, Metropolitan Film Festival, Milan, La Città dell’Utopia International Film Festival, Rome, Kerala Short Film Festival, Northeast International Documentary and Film Festival, Pune Short Film Festival, Goa Short Film Festival, Kalakari Film Festival, Kuala Lumpur International Film Academy Awards, Alibag Short Film Festival, Midnight Monster Club Short Film Festival, and several other international film festivals, with nominations for Best Film and Best Concept at the Durgapur International Film Festival 2025.
