= Royal Brighton Yacht Club =

Sailing club in Melbourne, Victoria, Australia

Coordinates: 37°54′33″S 144°59′11″E

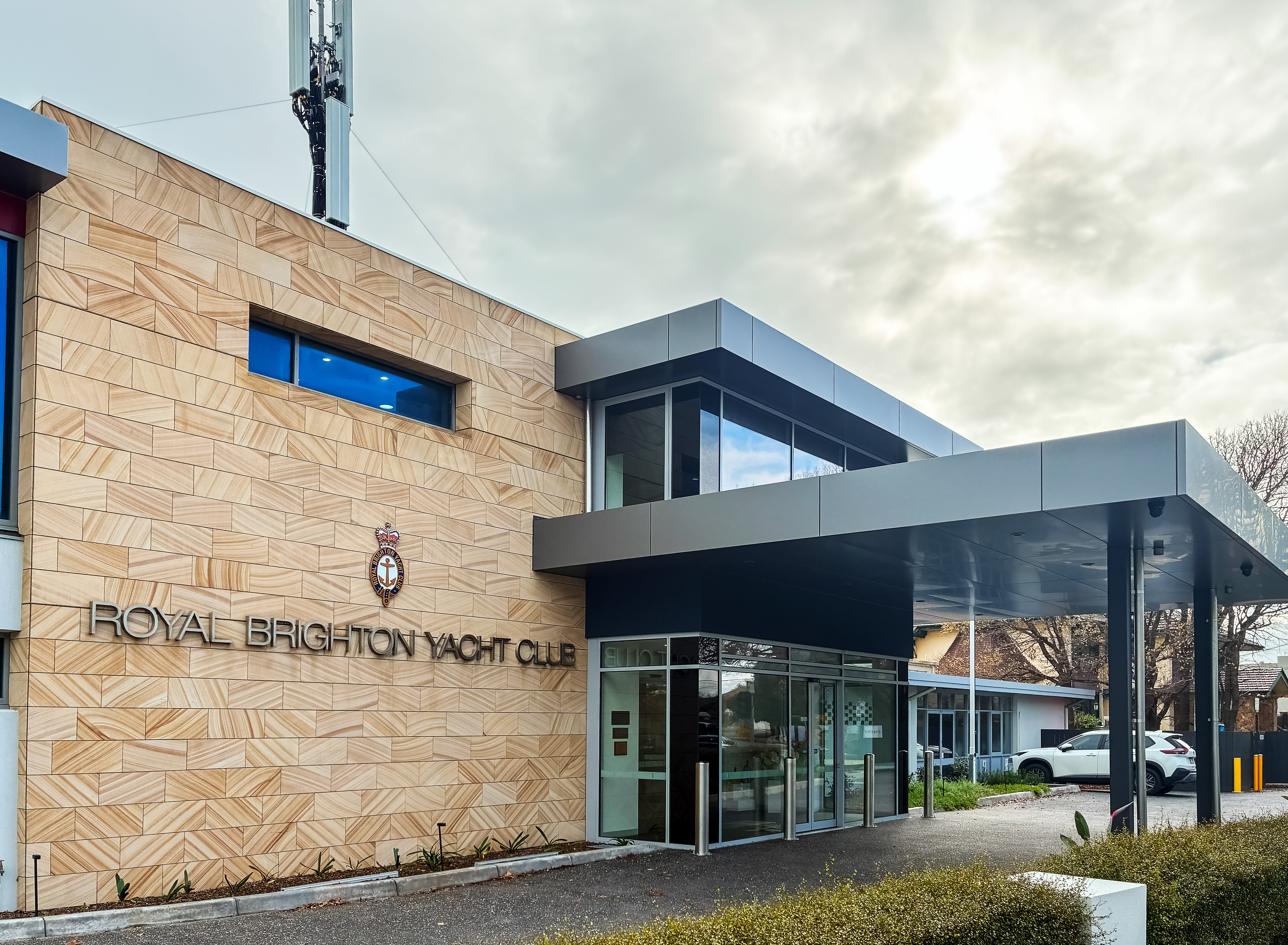
- Street entrance to the clubhouse in 2025

- Ensign
- Full name: Royal Brighton Yacht Club, Inc.
- Short name: RBYC
- Founded: September 1875; 151 years ago (as the Brighton Sailing Club)
- Location: Brighton, Melbourne, Port Phillip Bay, Victoria, Australia
- Commodore: Cath Hurley (since 2026)
- Website: rbyc.org.au

The Royal Brighton Yacht Club is a yacht club, located at Brighton, on Port Phillip Bay, in the south-eastern suburbs of Melbourne, in Victoria, Australia. The street address for the club is 253 The Esplanade, Brighton.

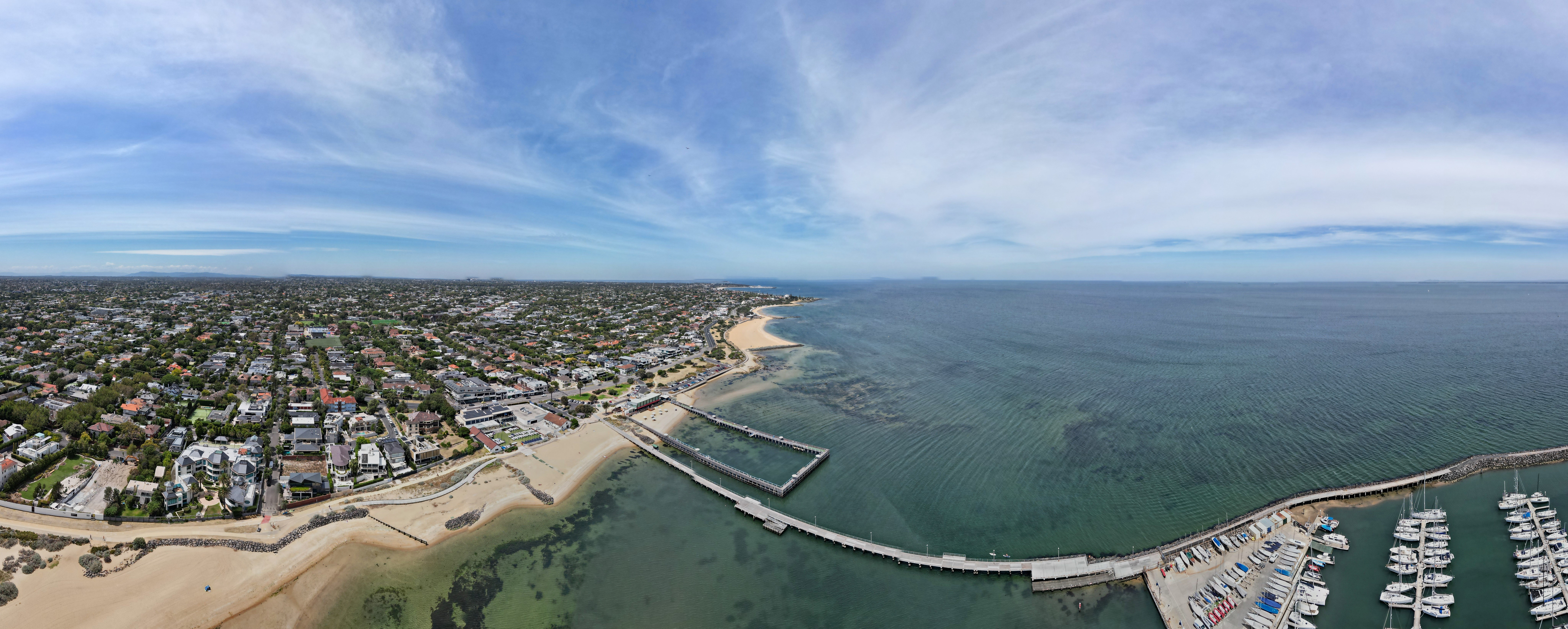
Aerial panorama of the nearby Middle Brighton Pier with the RBYC fleet of yachts shown at right, looking south into Port Phillip Bay, 2023

== Regattas ==
In December 2019, the Royal Brighton Yacht Club held the Finn (dinghy) class Gold Cup.

== Notable members ==
- John Bertrand – skipper of the victorious Australia II in the 1983 America's Cup
- Sarah Blanck – represented Australia in the Athens 2004 Olympics in the Europe Dinghy one class design
- Mark Turnbull – Australian gold medalist at the Sydney 2000 Olympics in the Double-Handed Dinghy 470 class
- Some of the Brighton Icebergers – members of the Brighton Yacht club

== See also ==
- Ocean Racing Club of Victoria
