= Robert Francis Van Wisse =

American criminal (born 1965)

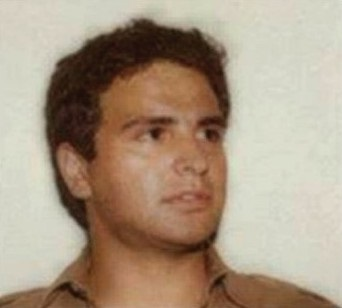

FBI Ten Most Wanted Fugitive
- Charges: Unlawful Flight to Avoid Prosecution - Murder
- Reward: Up to $100,000
- Alias: Francisco Salas, Roberto Francisco Salas, Robert F. Vanwisse, Robert Wisse, Robert F. Van Wisse, Robert Francis Vanwise, Robert Vanwisse

Description
- Born: February 3, 1965 (age 61); Guadalajara, Mexico
- Gender: Male
- Height: 5 ft 6 in (1.68 m)
- Weight: 180 lb (82 kg)
- Occupation: English teacher in Mexico, possibly a medical or agricultural worker

Status
- Convictions: Murder
- Penalty: 30 years imprisonment
- Added: December 13, 2016
- Surrendered: January 26, 2017
- Number: 511
- Surrendered

Robert Francis Van Wisse (born February 3, 1965) is an American criminal who was added to the FBI Ten Most Wanted Fugitives list in December 2016, in relation to a sexual assault and murder in Austin, Texas, in September 1983. In January 2017, he surrendered to U.S. officials. On March 28, 2017, Van Wisse pleaded guilty to murder and was sentenced to 30 years in prison.

== Crime ==
On September 19, 1983, Laurie Stout, who owned a janitorial service in Austin with her husband, went into a building which she was hired to clean. Her body was found at 8:30 the following morning in the second floor men's bathroom where she was working. She had been sexually assaulted and murdered. The Austin Police Department later ruled Stout's death was a homicide due to strangulation and asphyxia.

Everyone who was in the building that evening was questioned, including 18-year-old Van Wisse, who was late registering for a class at the University of Texas at the time. He was given fingerprinting and DNA testing, and ruled out as a suspect at the time due to the underdeveloped DNA technology in 1983.

=== Cold case investigation ===
In 1992, an investigator was hired to reopen the cold case. She found that the 1983 testing of Van Wisse's DNA was misleading due to outdated technology, and after reevaluation he was determined to be the prime suspect.

On October 3, 1996, a state arrest warrant was issued for Van Wisse in Travis County, Texas, after he was charged in Stout's murder. On March 6, 1997, Van Wisse was also charged with unlawful flight to avoid prosecution and a Federal arrest warrant was issued for Van Wisse by the United States District Court in Austin. On December 13, 2016, Van Wisse became the 511th person added to the FBI Ten Most Wanted Fugitives list, with a $100,000 reward. On January 26, 2017, he surrendered to U.S. officials in Laredo, Texas, at the Mexican border.

On March 28, 2017, Van Wisse pleaded guilty to murder and was sentenced to 30 years in prison. His attorneys, Perry Minton and Rick Flores, said that plea deal negotiations were started before Van Wisse turned himself in.
