= Chinmoy =

Chinmoy may refer to

- Chinmoy Barma, Indian filmmaker
- Chinmoy Chattopadhyay, Bengali singer
- Chinmoy Deb Barman, Indian politician
- Chinmoy Guha, Indian essayist and translator.
- Chinmoy Lahiri, Indian vocalist
- Chinmoy Roy, Indian Bengali actor.
- Chinmoy Sankar Dey, Indian molecular biologist
- Sri Chinmoy, Indian spiritual leader
