= Tammy van Wisse =

Australian swimmer (born 1968)

Personal information
- Born: 23 July 1968 (age 58) Melbourne, Australia

Sport
- Sport: Swimming
- Strokes: Long-distance swimming, marathon swimming

Tammy van Wisse (born 23 July 1968) is a long-distance swimmer from Australia. In 1990, she won the Lake Zurich Swim. As a marathon swimmer, she swam the Murray River in 2001, a distance of 2,438 kilometres (1,515 mi). She also swam the English Channel in 1993 in a time of 8 hours 35 minutes, and again in 1994 in a time of 8 hours 33 minutes. In 1996, she became the first and only human to swim across Bass Strait, recording a time of 17 hours and 46 minutes for the 97.4-kilometre (60.5 mi) journey.

In addition to her marathon swimming records, van Wisse was a dominant competitor in pool and still-water lifesaving. She holds the record for winning the Victorian Royal Lifesaving Iron Woman title for 17 consecutive years between the 1980s and 1990s. This achievement is distinct from the surf-based Ironwoman series; van Wisse competed primarily in Royal Life Saving disciplines, which focus on pool and flat-water rescue skills, though she also achieved success in open water events such as the Lorne Pier to Pub, which she won three times (1986, 1987, and 1989).

In July 2006, van Wisse broke an 81-year-old record (held by Gertrude Jacobs Ederle) for the 35-kilometre (22 mi) swim from New York City to Sandy Hook, and retired from competitive swimming the same year to start a family, twenty years after her first marathon swim. She now works as an environmentalist and a motivational speaker.

== Health ==
In October 2022, van Wisse was diagnosed with breast cancer. Following the diagnosis, she underwent a double mastectomy; however, her recovery was complicated by a severe infection and septicaemia, which required multiple emergency surgeries to stabilize her condition. She subsequently endured six months of chemotherapy and radiation therapy before being declared in remission in July 2023.

In October 2025, approximately two years after entering remission, van Wisse announced that her cancer had returned. After experiencing pain she initially attributed to physical training, medical scans revealed she had developed stage 4 metastatic breast cancer, which had spread to her lungs and bones. Although the condition was diagnosed as incurable, van Wisse stated that it remains treatable, and she subsequently began a regimen of hormone and radiation therapy to manage the illness.
