= Religion in Russia =

Orthodox Christianity is the most widely professed religion in Russia, with significant minorities of non-religious people and adherents of other faiths. Russia has the world's largest Orthodox population.

The constitution of Russia recognises the right to freedom of conscience and creed to all the citizenry, the spiritual contribution of Orthodox Christianity to the history of Russia, and respect to "Christianity, Islam, Buddhism, Judaism and other religions and creeds which constitute an inseparable part of the historical heritage of Russia's peoples", including ethnic religions or paganism, either preserved, or revived.

== Overview ==
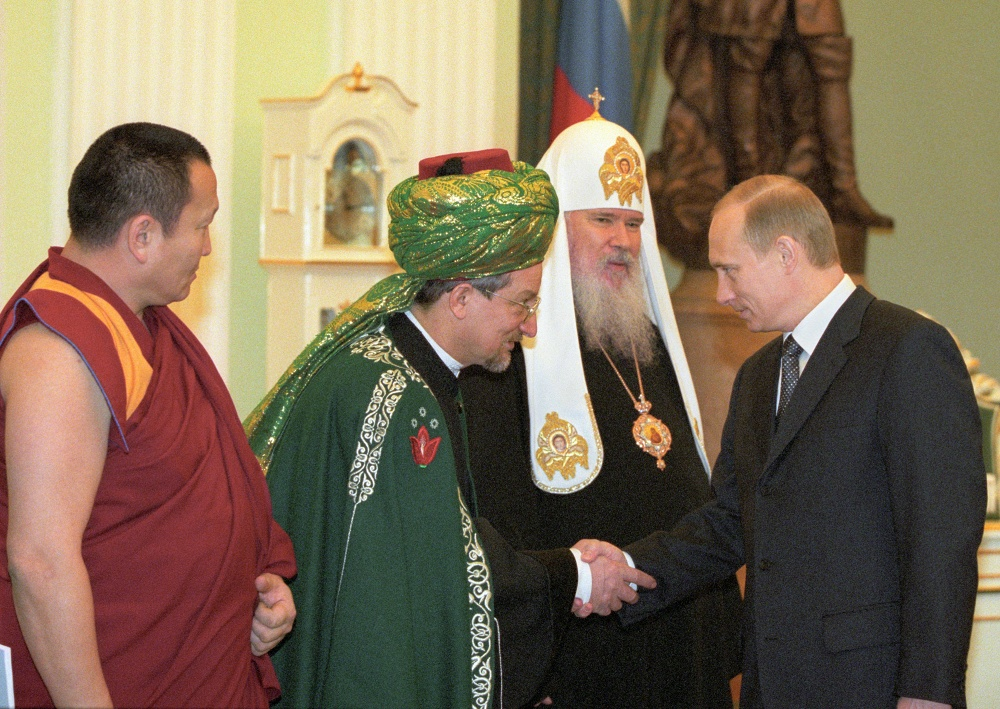
Russian President Vladimir Putin meeting with religious leaders of Russia (left to right: Pandito Hambo Lama Damba Ayusheev, Head of Buddhist Traditional Sangha of Russia; Supreme Mufti Sheikh-ul-Islam Talgat Tajuddin, Chairman of the Central Muslim Board of Russia; and Patriarch of Moscow and All Russia Alexy II) in 2001

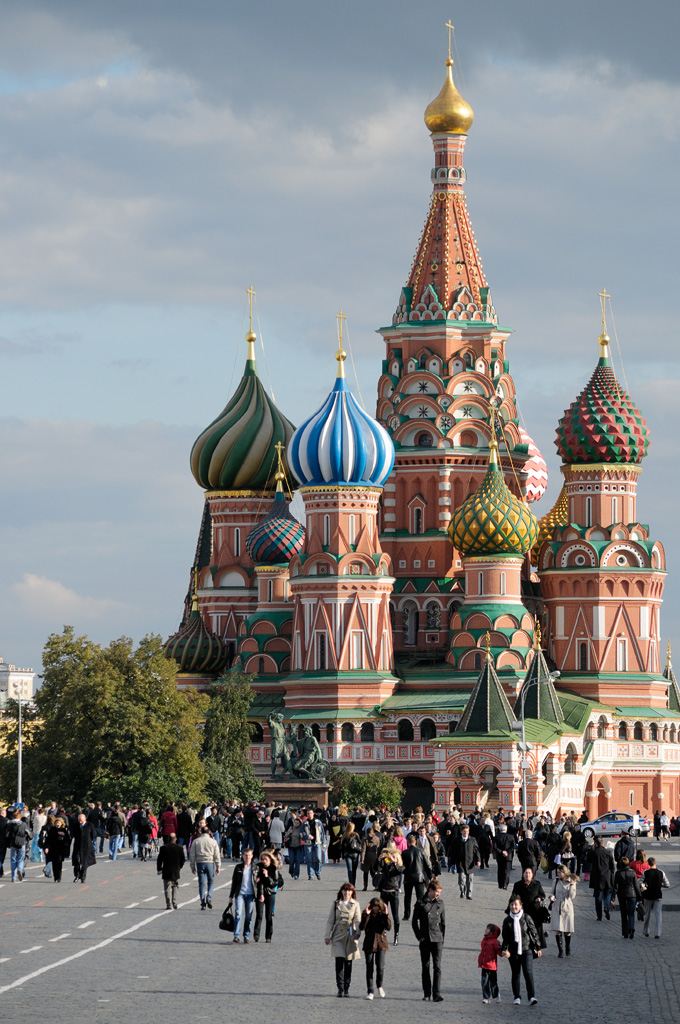
St. Basil's Russian Orthodox Cathedral in Moscow is a World Heritage Site.

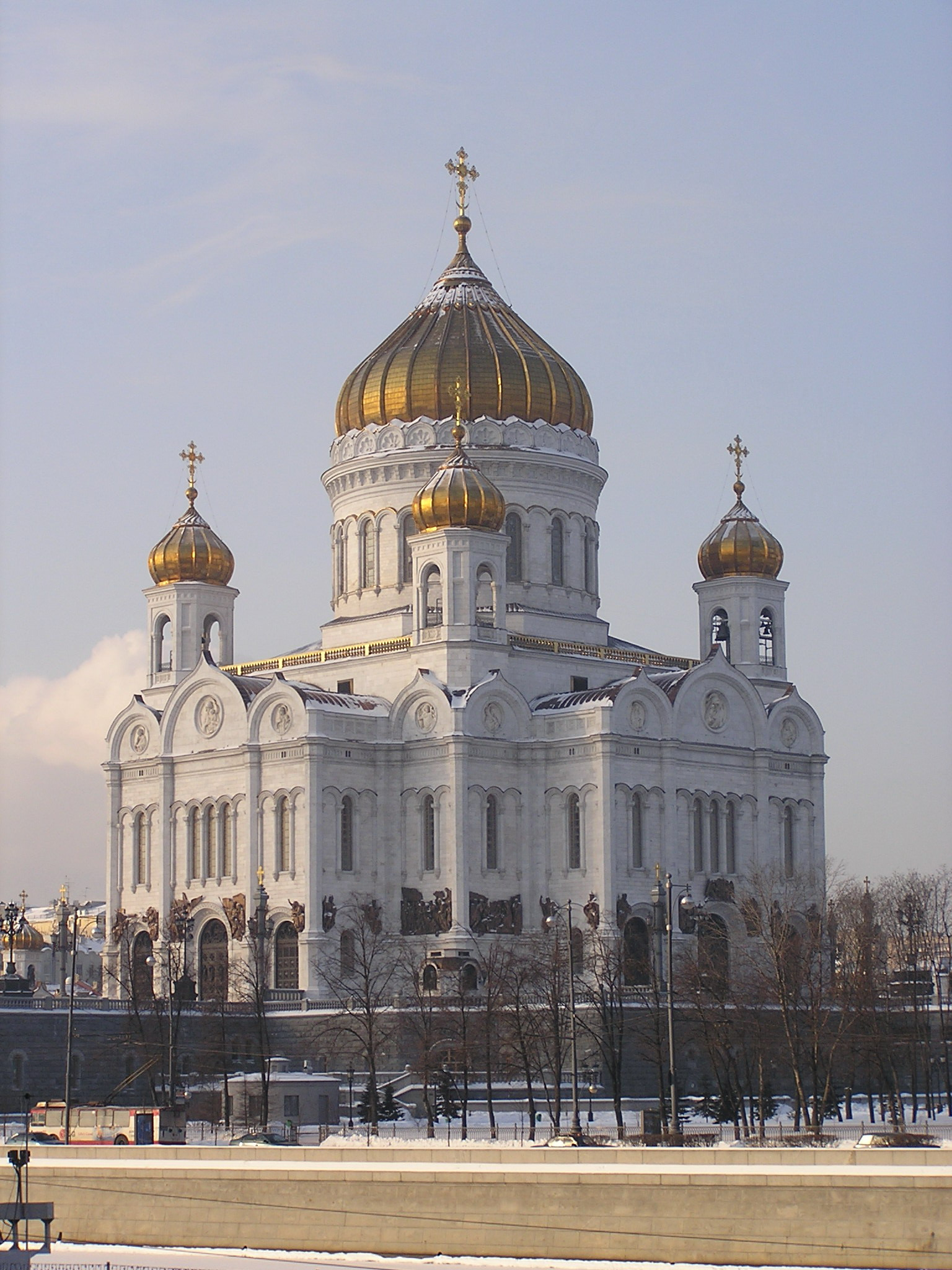
Cathedral of Christ the Saviour in Moscow.

According to the Russian law, any religious organisation may be recognised as "traditional", if it was already in existence before 1982, and each newly founded religious group has to provide its credentials and re-register yearly for fifteen years, and, in the meantime until eventual recognition, stay without rights.

The Russian Orthodox Church, though its influence is thin in some parts of Siberia and southern Russia, where there has been a perceptible revival of pre-Christian religion, acts as the de facto, if not de jure, privileged religion of the state, claiming the right to decide which other religions or denominations are to be granted the right of registration. Some Protestant churches which were already in existence before the Russian Revolution have been unable to re-register, and the Catholic Church has been forbidden to develop its own territorial jurisdictions. According to some Western observers, respect for freedom of religion by Russian authorities has declined since the late 1990s and early 2000s. For example, the activities of the Jehovah's Witnesses are currently banned in Russia. According to International Christian Concern, during 2021 "crackdowns on religious freedom have intensified in Russia".

Since the dissolution of the Soviet Union in 1991 there has been a revival and spread of Siberian shamanism (often mixed with Orthodox elements), and the emergence of Hinduism and new religious movements throughout Russia. There has been an "exponential increase in new religious groups and alternative spiritualities", Eastern religions and Neopaganism, even among self-defined "Christians"—a term which has become a loose descriptor for a variety of eclectic views and practices. Russia has been defined by the scholar Eliot Borenstein as the "Southern California of Europe" because of such a blossoming of new religious movements, and the latter are perceived by the Russian Orthodox Church as competitors in a "war for souls". However, the multiplicity of religions in Russia has been a traditional component of Russian identities for hundreds of years, contributing to a long-established ethno-cultural pluralism.

One of the 2020 amendments to the Constitution of Russia has Constitutional references to God.

== History ==
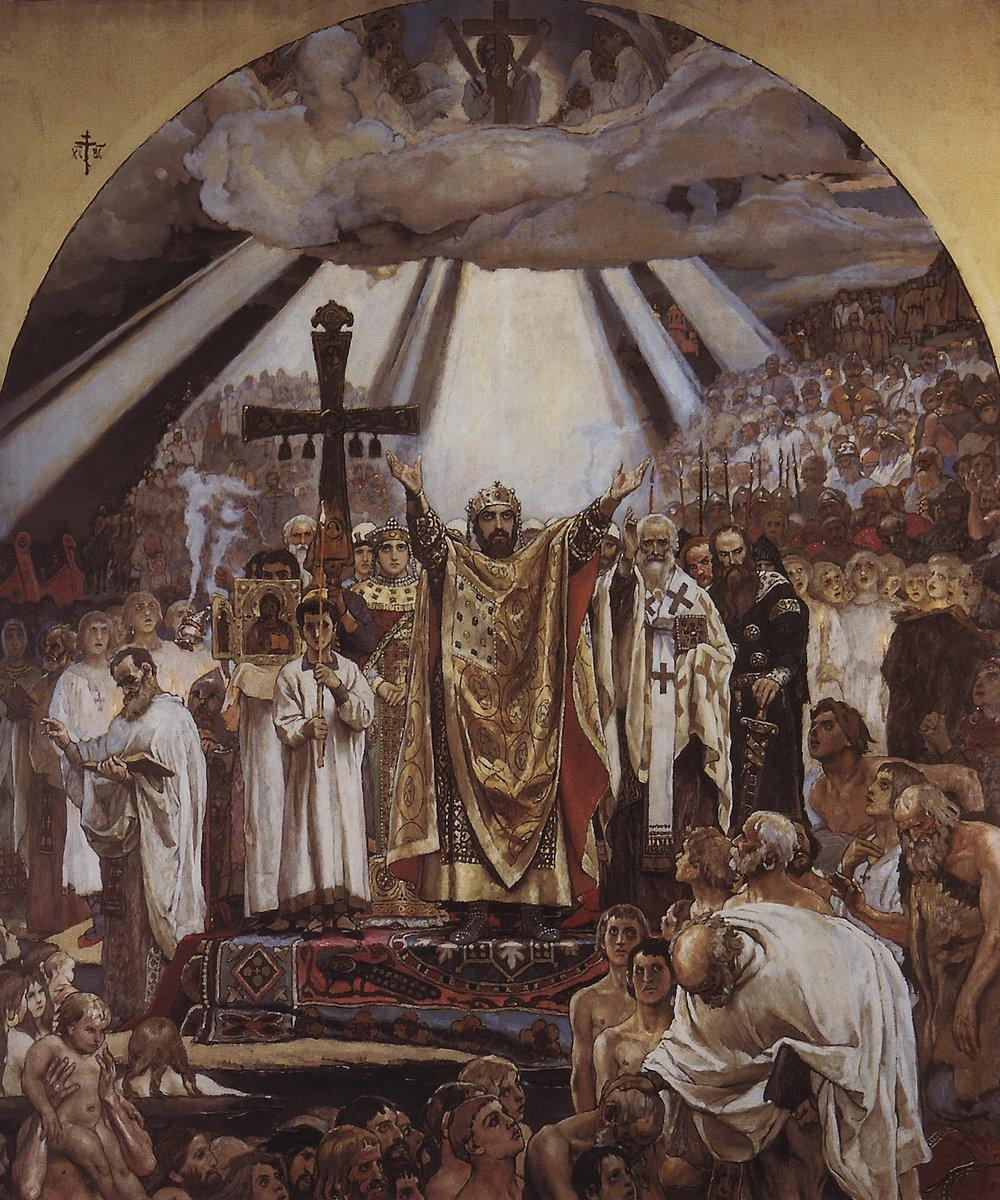
The Baptism of Rus' (1885–1896), by Viktor Vasnetsov.

Before the tenth century, Russians practised Slavic religion. As recalled by the Primary Chronicle, Orthodox Christianity was made the state religion of Kievan Rus' in 987 by Vladimir the Great, who opted for it among other possible choices as it was the religion of the Byzantine Empire. Since then, religion, mysticism, and statehood remained intertwined elements in Russia's identity. The Russian Orthodox Church, perceived as the glue consolidating the nation, accompanied the expansion of the Russian Empire in the eighteenth century. Czar Nicholas I's ideology, under which the empire reached its widest extent, proclaimed "Orthodoxy, autocracy, and nation" (Pravoslavie, samoderzhavie, narodnost') as its foundations. The dominance of the Russian Orthodox Church was sealed by law, and, as the empire incorporated peoples of alternative creeds, religions were tied to ethnicities to skirt any issue of integration. Until 1905, only the Russian Orthodox Church could engage in missionary activity to convert non-Orthodox people, and apostasy was treated as an offense punishable by law. Catholicism, Islam and other religions were tolerated only among outsider (inoroditsy) peoples but forbidden from spreading among Russians.

Throughout the history of early and imperial Russia there were, however, religious movements which posed a challenge to the monopoly of the Russian Orthodox Church and put forward stances of freedom of conscience, namely the Old Believers—who separated from the Russian Orthodox Church after Patriarch Nikon's reform in 1653 (the Raskol)—, and Spiritual Christianity. It is worth noting that the Russian Orthodox Church itself never forbade personal religious experience and speculative mysticism, and Gnostic elements had become embedded in Orthodox Christianity since the sixth century, and later strengthened by the popularity of Jakob Böhme's thought in sixteenth- and seventeenth-century Orthodox seminaries.

By the end of the eighteenth century, dvoeverie ("double faith"), popular religion which preserved Slavic pantheism under a Christianised surface, found appreciation among intellectuals who tried to delineate Russian distinctiveness against the West. On 17 April 1905, Tsar Nicholas II decreed that religious minorities had the right to publicly celebrate their respective liturgies. At the dawn of the twentieth century, esoteric and occult philosophies and movements, including Spiritualism, Theosophy, Anthroposophy, Hermeticism, Russian cosmism and others, became widespread. At the same time the empire had begun to make steps towards the recognition of the multiplicity of religions that it had come to encompass, but they came to an abrupt end with the Russian Revolution in 1917. After the revolution, the Russian Orthodox Church lost its privileges, as did all minority religions, and the new state verged towards an atheist official ideology. Under the Soviet Union, the Russian Orthodox Church lived periods of repression and periods of support and cooptation by the state. Despite the policies of state atheism, censuses reported a high religiosity among the population; in 1929, 80% of the population were believers, and in 1937 two-thirds described themselves as believers, of whom three-fourths as Orthodox Christians. The Russian Orthodox Church was supported under Joseph Stalin in the 1940s, after the Second World War, then heavily suppressed under Nikita Khrushchev in the 1960s, and then revived again by the 1980s. While it was legally reconstituted only in 1949, throughout the Soviet period the church functioned as an arm of the KGB; many hierarchs of the post-Soviet church were former KGB agents, as demonstrated by the opening of KGB archives in the 1990s.

Since the collapse of the Soviet Union in 1987–1991, the Russian Orthodox Church has struggled to regain its erstwhile monopoly of religious life, despite it and other Christian churches which existed since before the Revolution have found themselves in a radically transformed context characterised by a religious pluralism unknown before 1917. During the Soviet period, religious barriers were shattered, as religions were no longer tied to ethnicity and family tradition, and an extensive displacement of peoples took place. This, together with the more recent swift ongoing development of communications, has resulted in an unprecedented mingling of different religious cultures. After the collapse of the Soviet Union, there was a renewal of religions in Russia, with the revival of the traditional faiths and the emergence of new forms within the traditional faiths as well as many new religious movements. The amendments of 2020 to the constitution added, in the Article 67, the continuity of the Russian state in history based on preserving "the memory of the ancestors" and general "ideals and belief in God" which the ancestors conveyed.

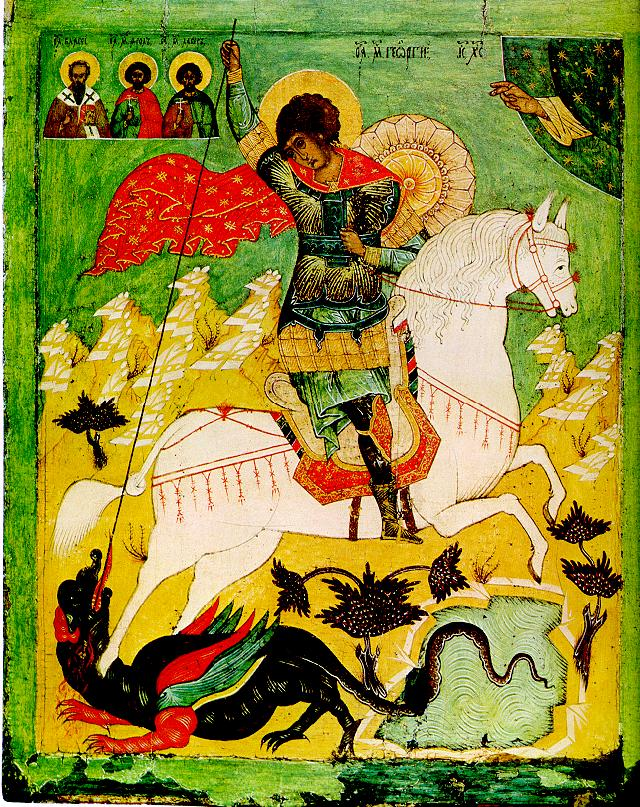
Saint George and the Dragon, 16th-century icon from Pskov.

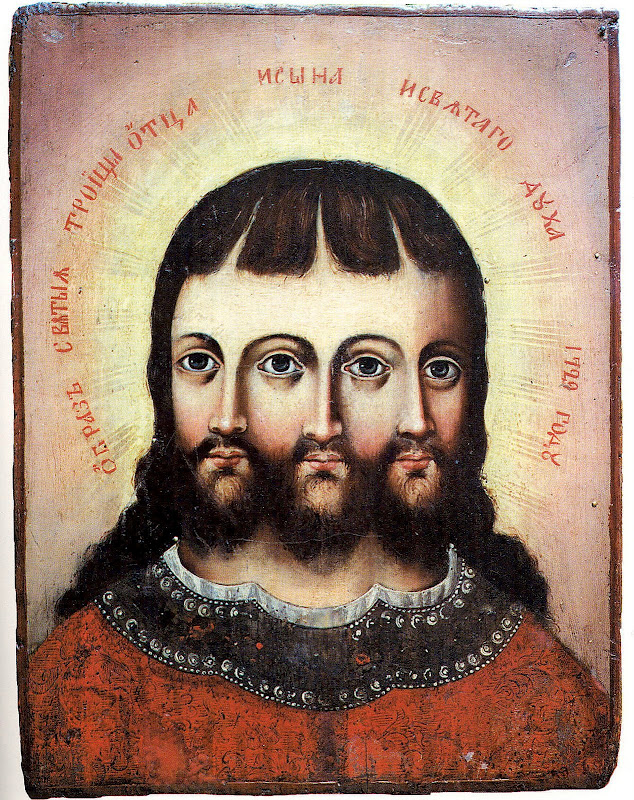
The Trinity (1729), icon by an unknown artist from Tobolsk.

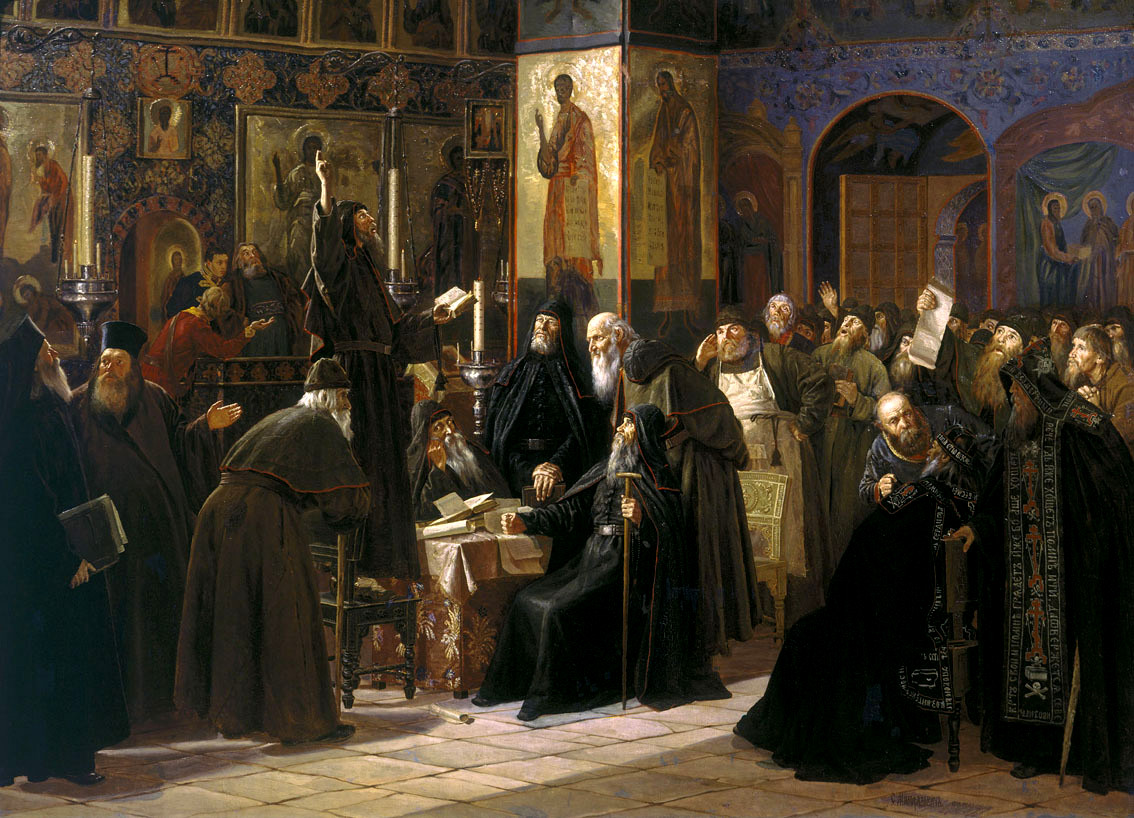
The Rebellion of Solovetsky Monastery (1885), by Sergey Miloradovich.

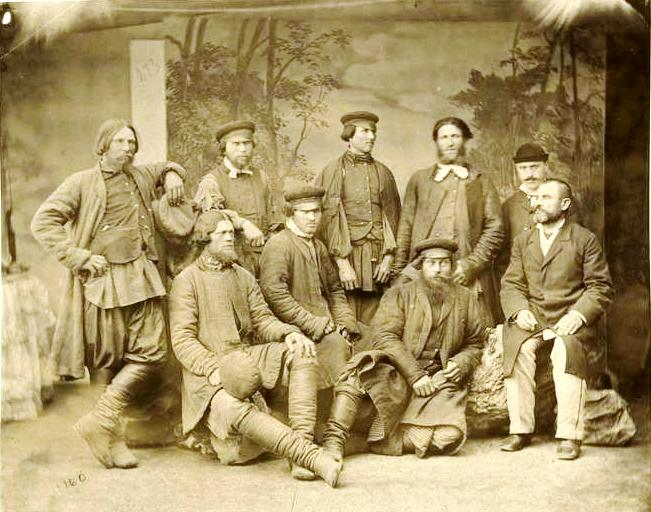
Group of Molokans, 1870s.

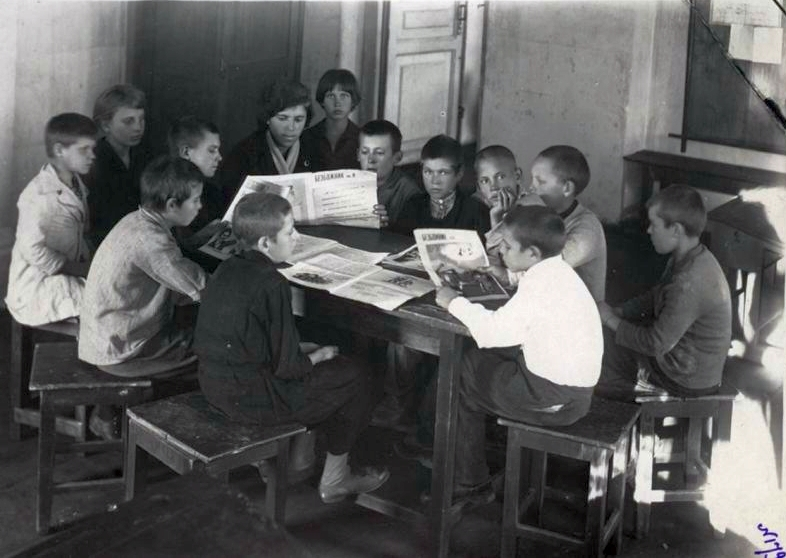
Circle of young atheists at a school in Murom, 1930s.

== Study approaches ==
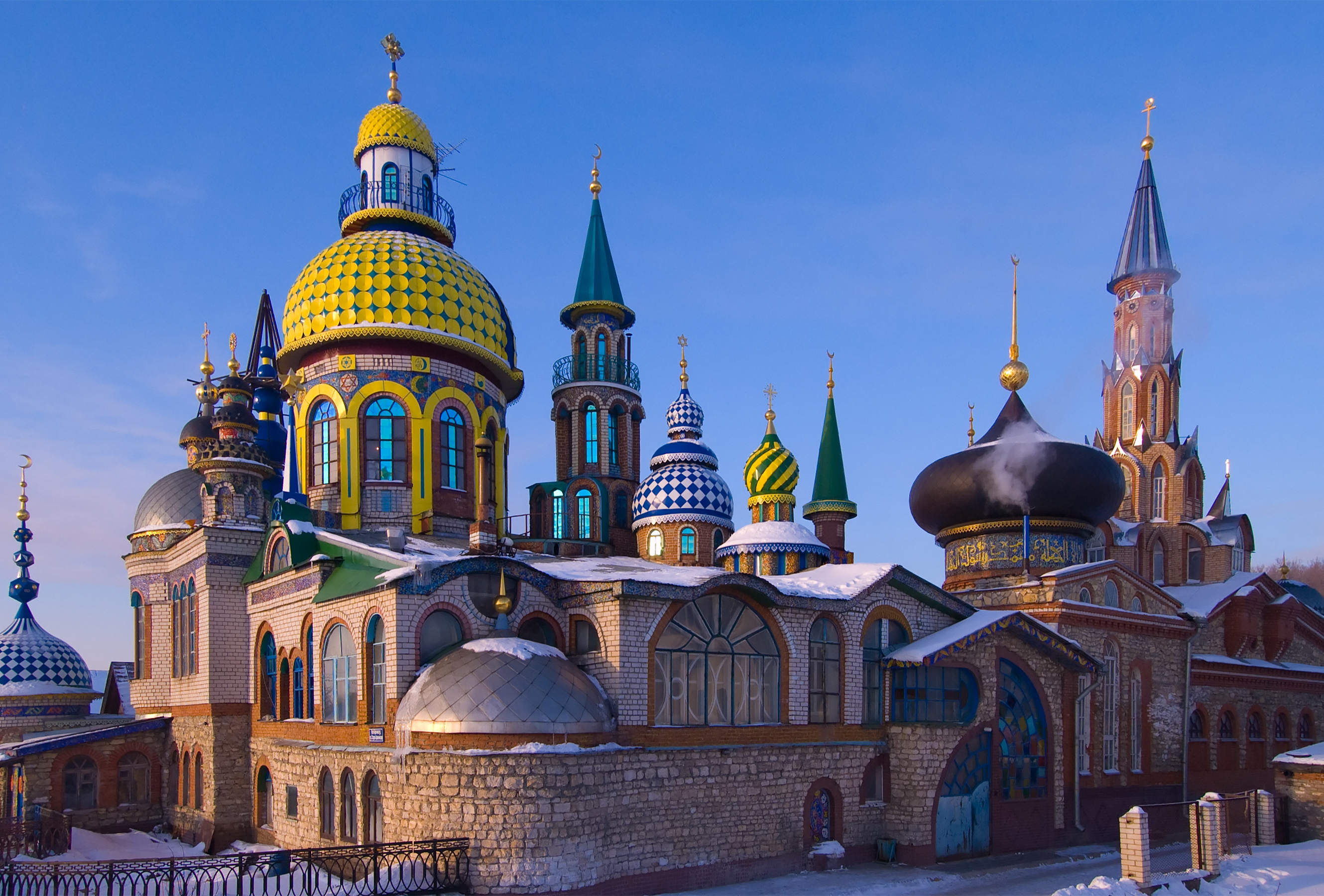
Syncretic Temple of All Religions in Kazan.

In the study of religions in Russia, the "ethnic principle" is based on the assumption that the entire number of people belonging to a given ethnic group are adherents of that group's traditional religion. This principle is often used to estimate the magnitude of very small groups, for instance Finnish Lutheranism at 63,000, assuming that all the 34,000 Finns and 28,000 Estonians of Russia are believers in their historical religion; or German Lutheranism at 400,000, assuming that all Germans in Russia believe in their historical religion. However, whether for small or larger groups, this approach may lead to gross mistakes.

The ethnic principle is sometimes misused to deliberately inflate the prevalence of certain religions, especially the larger ones, for political aims. For instance, Islamic and Orthodox leaders routinely claim that their religions have respectively 20 million and 120 million adherents in Russia, by counting all the individuals belonging to the ethnic groups which historically belonged to these religions. By applying the ethnic principle, people who are indifferent to religion or are outspoken atheists, those who have converted to a different faith to that assigned by nationality, and people who participate in religions which historically have not been associated to specific ethnic groups in Russia—namely Old Believers, new Russian converts to Protestantism, Catholicism and Eastern religions, and others—are automatically excluded from the calculations.

Another criterion to count religious populations in Russia is that of "religious observance". Based on this principle, very few Russians would be religious. It has been found that between 0.5% and 2% of people in big cities attend Easter services, and overall just between 2% and 10% of the total population (3 to 15 million people) are actively practising Orthodox Christians. The proportion of practising Muslims among ethnic groups which are historically Islamic is larger, 40% to 90% depending on the group, and yet smaller than any assumption based on the ethnic principle.

The most accurate criterion to count religious populations in Russia is that of "self-identification", which allows to count also those people who identify themselves with a given religion but do not actually practise it. This principle provides a picture of how much given ideas and outlooks are widespread among the people. Nevertheless, it has been noted that different people often give different meanings to the same identity markers; for instance, large percentages of people who self-identify as "Orthodox" have been found to believe that God is a "life force", to believe in reincarnation, astral connections, and other New Age ideas.

Another method that has sometimes been used to determine the magnitude of religions in Russia is to count the number of their officially registered organisations. Such criterion, however, leads to inaccurate assumptions for various reasons. There is not the same arithmetic relationship between religions' number of local organisations and the number of their believers, as different religions have different organisational structures. Furthermore, different religions have different attitudes towards the registration of their organisations, and secular authorities register some without difficulties while hinder the registration of others. For instance, the Russian Orthodox Church is eager to register its communities when they are still at the embryonal stage, and many of them are actually inactive; the Old Believers traditionally do not consider registration as essential, and some branches reject it in principle; and Protestant churches have the largest number of unregistered congregations, probably around ten thousand, most of them extremely small groups, and while many denominations discourage registration, they often also face a negative disposition from secular authorities.

== Demographics ==
Mapping of religions and life stances in Russia (Arena Atlas Survey, 2012)

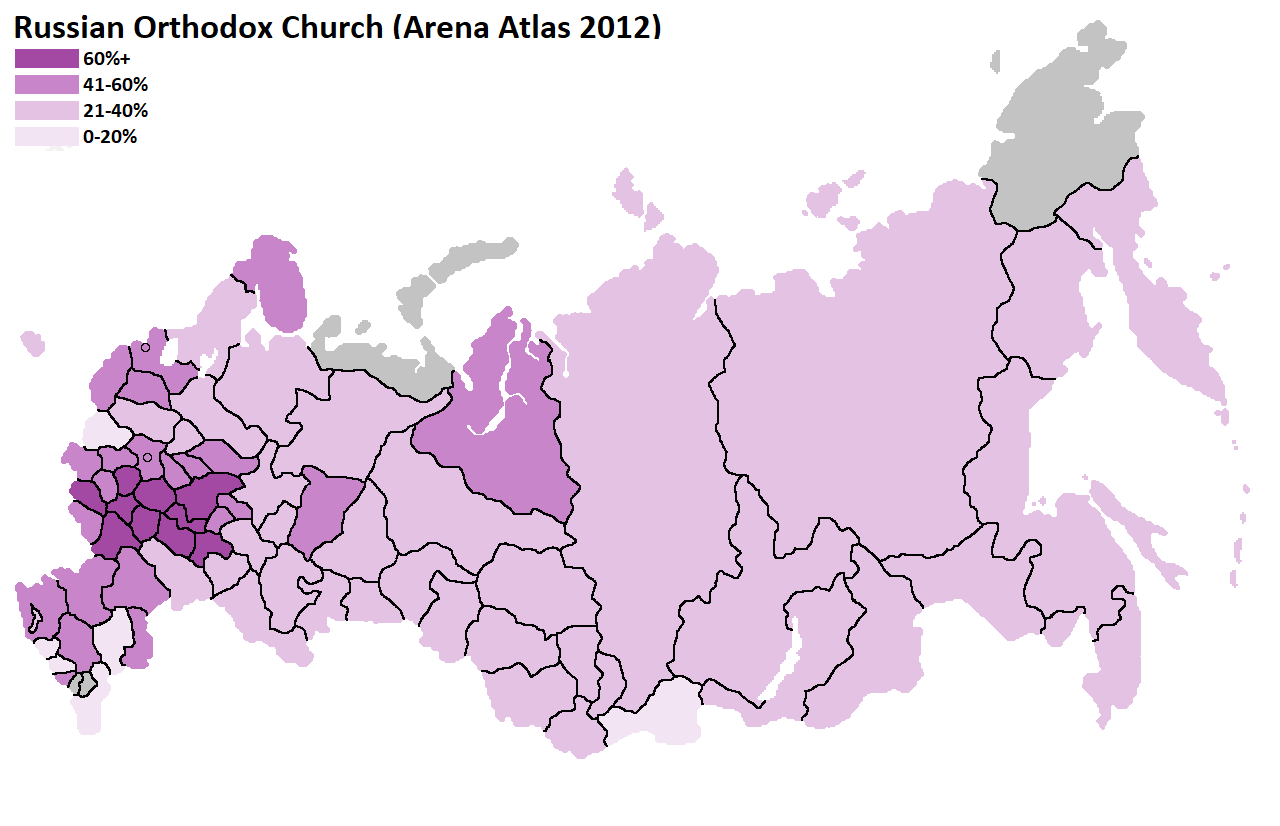
Russian Orthodox Church

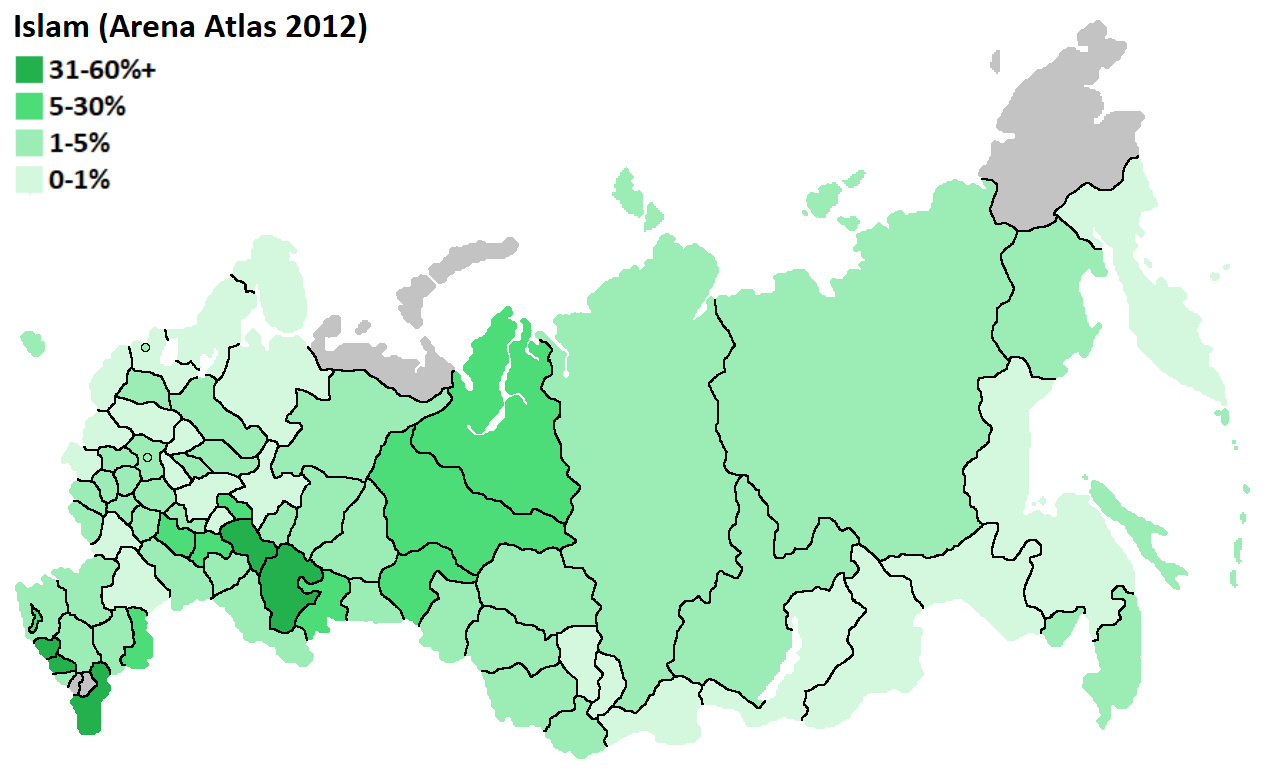
Muslims

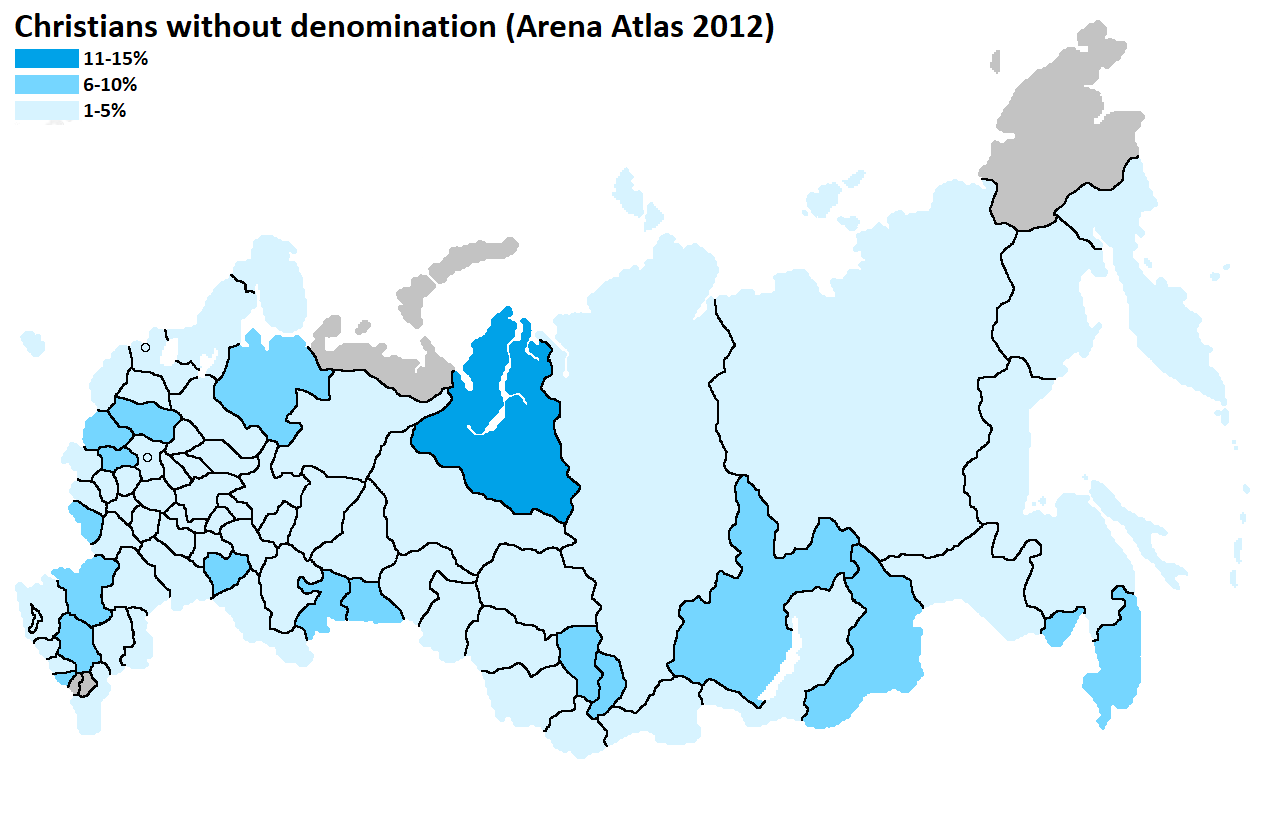
Nondenominational Christians

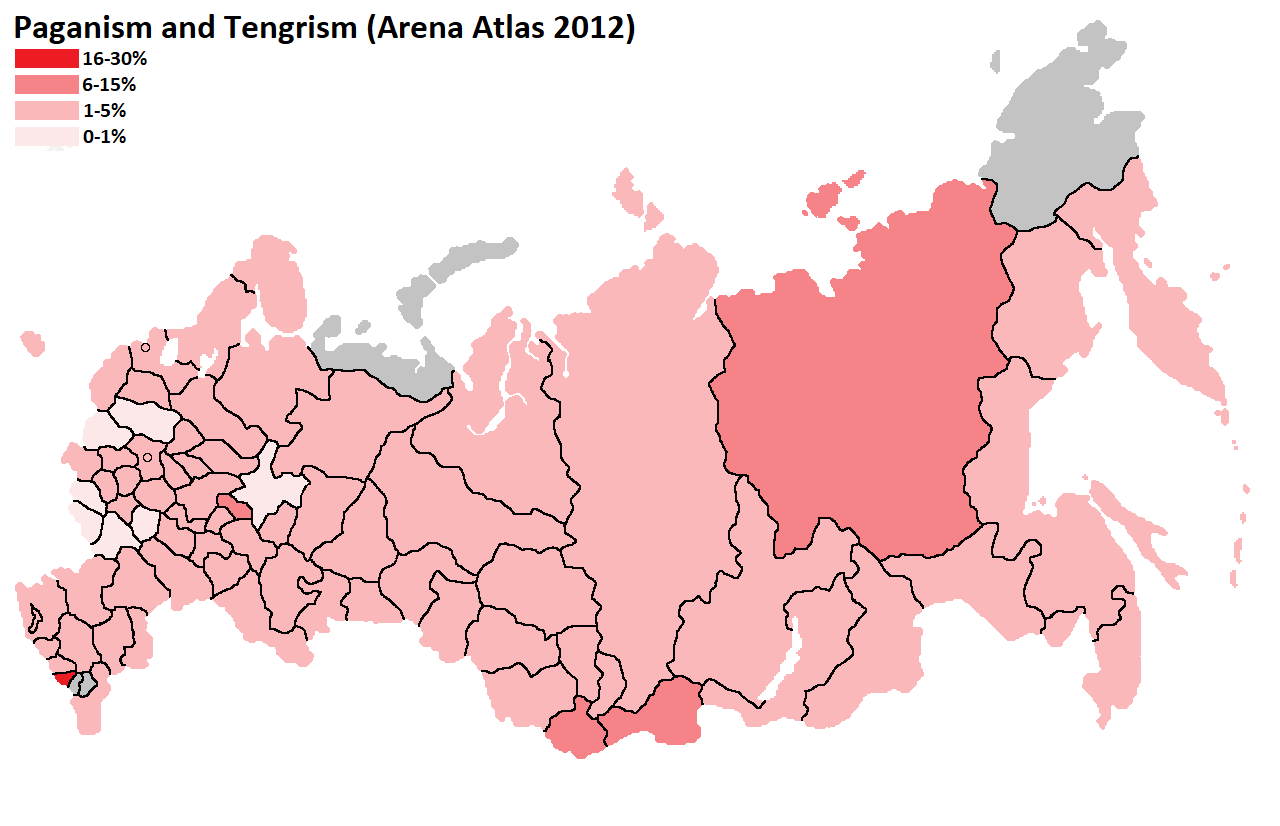
Pagans and Tengrists

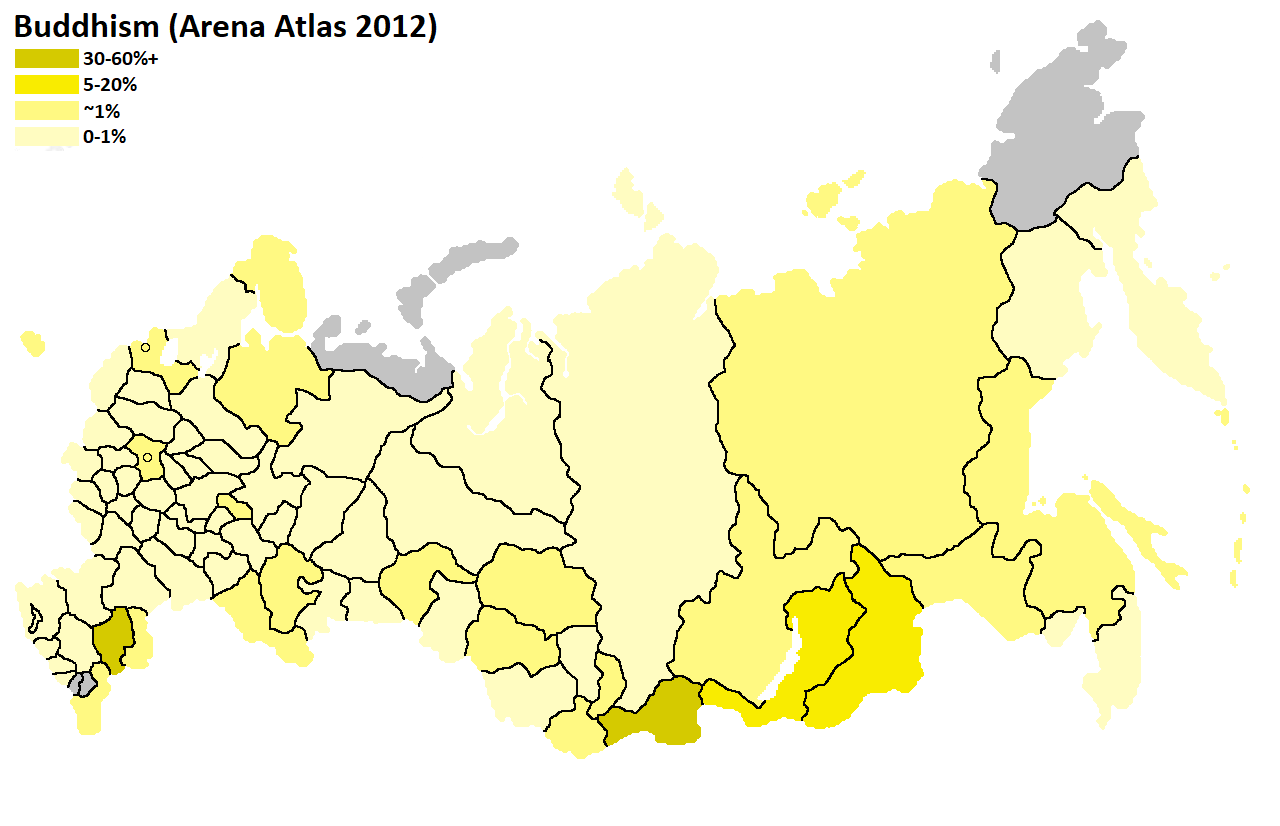
Buddhists

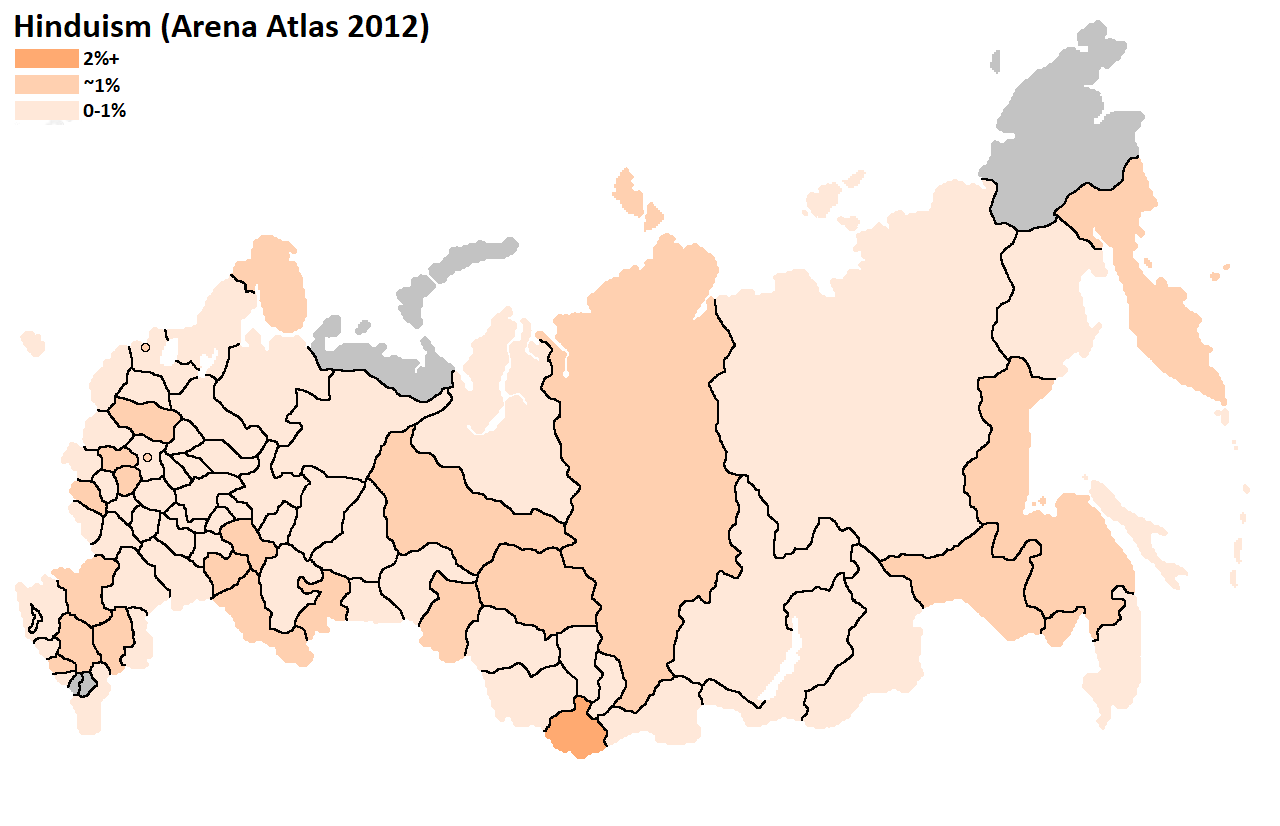
Hindus

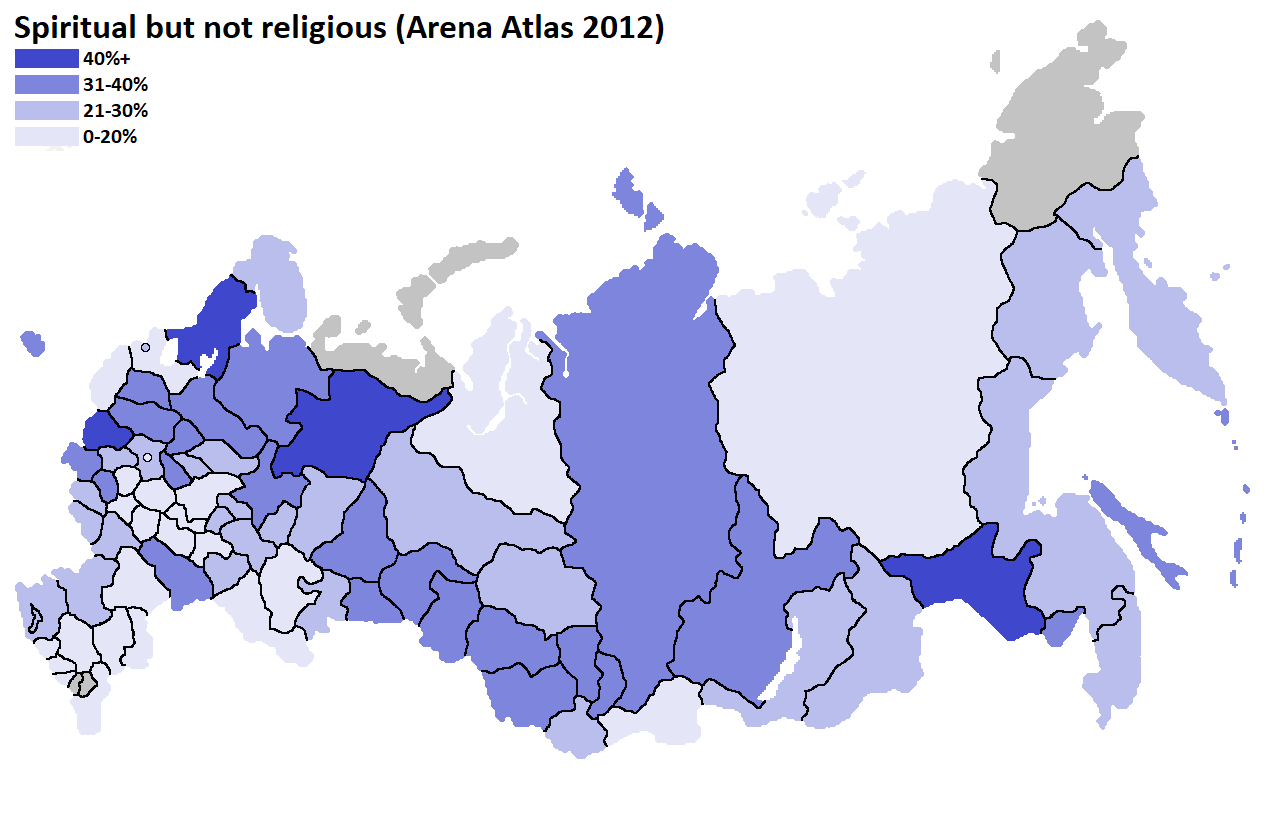
Spiritual, but do not profess a particular religion

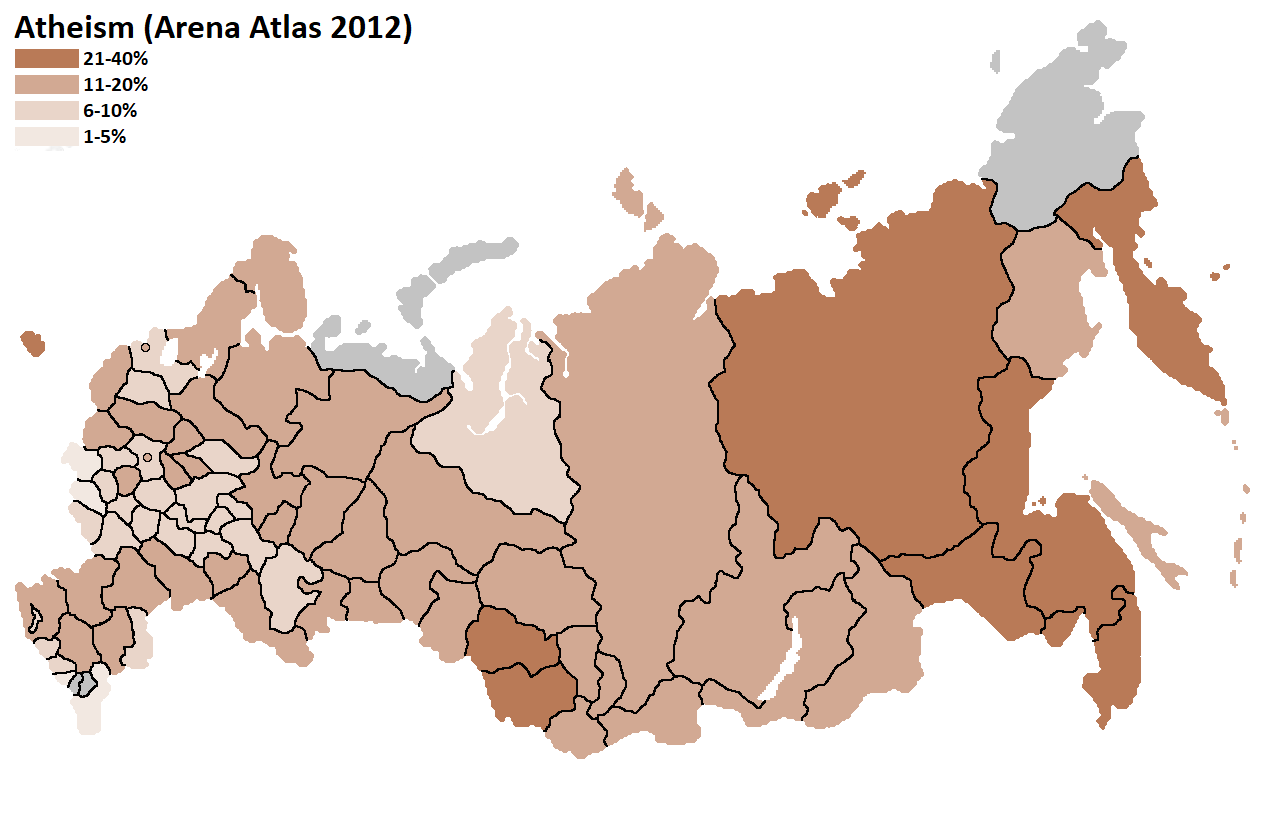
Atheists

In the August of 2012 the first large-scale survey and mapping of religions in Russia based on self-identification was published in the Sreda Arena Atlas, an extension of the 2010 Census, with data on seventy-nine out of eighty-three of the federal subjects of Russia. On a rounded total population of 142,800,000 the survey found that 66,840,000 persons, or 47.4% of the total population, were Christians. Among them, 58,800,000 or 41.1% of the population were believers in the Russian Orthodox Church, 5,900,000 or 4.1% were Christians without any denomination, 2,100,000 or 1.5% were believers in Orthodox Christianity without belonging to any church or (a smaller minority) belonging to non-Russian Orthodox churches (including Armenian and Georgian), 400,000 or 0.2% were Orthodox Old Believers, 300,000 or 0.2% were Protestants, and 140,000 (less than 0.1%) were Catholics. Among the non-Christians, 9,400,000 or 6.5% of the population were Muslims (including Sunni Islam, Shia Islam, and a majority of unaffiliated Muslims), 1,700,000 or 1.2% were pagans (including Rodnovery, Assianism, and other religions) or Tengrists (Turco-Mongol Shamanic religions and new religions), 700,000 or 0.5% were Buddhists (mostly of the Tibetan schools), 140,000 or 0.1% were Hindus (including Krishnaites), and 140,000 were religious Jews. Among the not religious population, 36,000,000 people or 25% declared to "believe in God (or in a higher power)" but to "not profess any particular religion", 18,600,000 or 13% were atheists, and 7,900,000 or 5.5% did not state any religious, spiritual or atheist belief.

Religion in Russia (Arena Atlas 2012)
Religion
Religion	Number	%
Christianity	67,720,000	47.4
–Russian Orthodox Church	58,750,000	41.1
–Other Orthodox Churches	2,140,000	1.5
–Old Believers' Orthodoxy	460,000	0.3
–Unaffiliated Christianity	5,800,000	4.1
–Protestantism and Pentecostalism	390,000	0.3
–Catholicism	180,000	0.1
Believers, but do not profess a particular religion	35,920,000	25.2
Islam	9,320,000 (Note: The Sreda Arena Atlas 2012 did not count the populations of two Muslim-majority federal subjects of Russia, namely Chechnya and Ingushetia, which together had a population of nearly 2 million, thus the proportion of Muslims may be slightly underestimated.)	6.5
Paganism	1,740,000	1.2
–Rodnovery	750,000	0.5
–Tengrism, Siberian shamanism, Assianism and other paganisms	950,000	0.7
Buddhism	660,000	0.5
Hinduism	90,000	0.1
Religious Jews	90,000	0.1
Atheism	18,590,000	13
Not stated	7,790,000	5.5
Total population	142,800,000	

=== Chronological statistics ===
Data about religion in Russia provided by or linked with government ministries (1998, Ministry of Education; 2012 Arena Atlas, Ministry of Justice)
Religion	1998		2012	
Religion	Number	%	Number	%
Orthodox Christianity	74,278,513	50.3	61,350,000	43.0
Islam	5,906,840	4.0	9,400,000	6.5
Atheism	67,485,647	45.7	18,600,000	13.0
Unaffiliated believers	67,485,647	45.7	36,000,000	25.0
Other religions	67,485,647	45.7	12,000,000	8.4
Not stated	67,485,647	45.7	7,900,000	5.5
Total population	147,671,000		142,800,000	

Data about religion in Russia provided by the state-owned Russian Public Opinion Research Center (VCIOM)
Religious affiliation 2017–2025
	2017	2018	2019	2020	2021	2022	2023	2024	2025
Orthodox Christianity	75%	72%	70%	68%	66%	68%	68%	66%	67%
Islam	6%	6%	5%	5%	6%	6%	5%	6%	7%
Buddhism	<1%	1%	1%	<1%	1%	<1%	1%	1%	1%
Protestantism	1%	<1%	1%	<1%	1%	1%	2%	1%	1%
Catholicism	<1%	1%	<1%	<1%	<1%	<1%	1%	<1%	<1%
Judaism	<1%	<1%	<1%	<1%	<1%	<1%	<1%	<1%	<1%
Unaffiliated believers	4%	3%	3%	3%	4%	4%	4%	4%	3%
Unsured	5%	6%	6%	5%	6%	4%	5%	3%	4%
Atheists	7%	8%	12%	12%	14%	12%	11%	13%	11%
Other	-	-	2%	5%	2%	4%	3%	5%	4%
Not answered	2%	3%	<1%	2%	<1%	1%	<1%	1%	2%

Data about religion in Russia provided by the independent Public Opinion Foundation
Religious affiliation 1997–2024
	1997	2000	2005	2010	2014	2018	2019	2020	2021	2022	2023	2024
Orthodoxy	52%	56%	64%	64%	68%	63%	64%	59%	65%	63%	60%	62%
No religion	35%	32%	26%	21%	19%	23%	21%	26%	19%	23%	24%	21%
Islam	7%	5%	4%	7%	6%	8%	9%	8%	9%	8%	9%	9%
Other Christianity	0%	1%	1%	1%	1%	1%	2%	2%	2%	2%	1%	3%
Other religions	1%	1%	1%	1%	2%	1%	1%	1%	1%	2%	2%	1%
Undeclared	5%	5%	4%	6%	4%	4%	4%	5%	4%	3%	4%	4%

	Religious affiliation (2024)					
	Orthodoxy	No religion	Islam	Other Christianity	Other religions	Undeclared
Total	62%	21%	9%	3%	1%	4%
Gender
Male	57%	25%	9%	3%	2%	4%
Female	65%	18%	10%	3%	1%	3%
Age
18–30	47%	30%	13%	3%	2%	5%
31–45	63%	19%	11%	3%	1%	4%
46–60	64%	22%	9%	3%	1%	2%
60+	70%	17%	6%	2%	1%	4%
Education
Secondary or lower	60%	19%	14%	3%	1%	3%
Vocational	63%	22%	7%	2%	1%	4%
Higher	62%	22%	8%	3%	2%	3%
Federal district
Central	74%	16%	4%	2%	1%	3%
Northwestern	59%	33%	1%	1%	2%	4%
Southern	70%	14%	6%	4%	2%	5%
North Caucasian	22%	9%	68%	0%	0%	1%
Volga	59%	21%	13%	1%	1%	4%
Ural	57%	28%	6%	2%	1%	6%
Siberian	55%	25%	7%	8%	2%	3%
Far Eastern	59%	33%	2%	2%	0%	5%

=== Religions by federal district ===
Distribution of religions in the federal districts of Russia, in percentage (Arena Atlas 2012)
	Russian Orthodox	Other Orthodox	Old Believers	Protestants	Catholics	Pentecostals	Simply Christians	Unaffiliated Believers	Atheists	Simply Muslims	Sunni Muslims	Shia Muslims	Pagans / Tengrists	Buddhists	Religious Jews	Hindus
Central	51	2	<1	<1	<0.5	<0.5	3.6	24	10	1	1	<1	<1	<0.5	<0.5	<0.5
Northwestern	43	<1	<1	<0.5	<1	<0.5	3	27	15	1	<1	<0.5	<1	<0.5	<0.5	<0.5
Southern	50	1.3	<1	<0.5	<0.5	<0.5	4	22	12	2	<1	<1	<1	<1	<0.5	<0.5
North Caucasian^{1}	25	<1	<0.5	<0.5	<0.5	<0.5	4	12	8	20	20	<1	5	<0.5	<0.5	<0.5
Volga	42	1.3	<1	<1	<0.5	<0.5	3.5	22	11	12	<1	<1	1.3	<0.5	<0.5	<0.5
Ural	33	3	<1	<1	<1	<0.5	6	31	13	4	2	<1	1	<0.5	<0.5	<1
Siberian	29	2	<1	<1	<0.5	<0.5	5	32	18	1	<1	<0.5	2	2	<0.5	<0.5
Far Eastern	28	1	<1	<1	<0.5	<1	4	27	26	1	<0.5	<0.5	3	<1	<0.5	<0.5
All Russia	41	1.5	0.3	0.2	0.1	0.1	4.1	25	13	4.7	1.7	0.2	1.2	0.5	0.1	0.1

1. excluding Chechnya and Ingushetia.

=== Religions by federal subject ===
All the data, approximated, are from the Arena Atlas 2012.

Religions by republic

	Russian Orthodox	Other Orthodox	Old Believers	Protestants	Catholics	Pentecostals	Simply Christians	Unaffiliated Believers	Atheists	Simply Muslims	Sunni Muslims	Shia Muslims	Pagans / Tengrists	Buddhists	Religious Jews	Other
Adygea	35	1	<1	<1	<1	<1	3	20	8	23	1	<1	<1	<0.5	<0.5	1
Altai	28	<1	1.2	<0.5	<0.5	<0.5	3	25	14	6	<1	<0.5	13	<1	<0.5	1.6
Bashkortostan	16	4	<1	<1	<0.5	<0.5	1	10	5	60	<1	<0.5	2	<0.5	<0.5	2
Buryatia	27	<1	<1	<0.5	<0.5	<0.5	4.2	25	13	<1	<0.5	<0.5	1.8	20	<1	<1
Chechnya	n/a	n/a	n/a	n/a	n/a	n/a	n/a	n/a	n/a	n/a	n/a	n/a	n/a	n/a	n/a	n/a
Chuvashia	55	4	<1	<0.5	<0.5	<0.5	3	24	8	3	<0.5	<0.5	1.2	<0.5	<0.5	<1
Dagestan	1	<0.5	<1	<0.5	<0.5	<0.5	1	0	0	36	60	2	0	<1	<0.5	<1
Ingushetia	n/a	n/a	n/a	n/a	n/a	n/a	n/a	n/a	n/a	n/a	n/a	n/a	n/a	n/a	n/a	n/a
Kabardino-Balkaria	11.6	<0.5	<0.5	<1	<1	<0.5	4	5	4	60	10	<0.5	1	<0.5	<1	<0.5
Kalmykia	18	<0.5	<0.5	<0.5	<0.5	<0.5	1	13	13	4	<1	<0.5	3	38	<1	<0.5
Karachay-Cherkessia	11	<1	<0.5	<0.5	<0.5	<0.5	3	10	3	50	13	1	6	<0.5	<0.5	1
Karelia	27	<1	<1	1	<0.5	<0.5	2	44	18	<1	<0.5	<0.5	<1	<0.5	<0.5	<0.5
Khakassia	32	1.4	<0.5	<0.5	<1	<0.5	6	38	16	1	<0.5	<0.5	2	<1	<0.5	<1
Komi	30	1	1	<1	<0.5	<0.5	4	41	14	1	<1	<0.5	1	<0.5	<0.5	1
Mari El	48	1	<0.5	<1	<1	<0.5	4	25	6	6	<1	<0.5	6	<1	<0.5	1
Mordovia	69	<0.5	<1	<0.5	<0.5	<0.5	5	10	7	2	<1	<0.5	<0.5	<0.5	<0.5	<0.5
North Ossetia-Alania	49	2	<1	<0.5	<0.5	<0.5	10	1	3	3	1	<0.5	29	<0.5	<0.5	<1
Sakha-Yakutia	38	<1	<0.5	<0.5	<0.5	<0.5	1	17	26	1	1	<0.5	13	<1	<0.5	<1
Tatarstan	30	<1	<0.5	<0.5	<0.5	<0.5	2	1	5	52	1	<0.5	<1	<0.5	<0.5	<1
Tuva	1	<1	<1	<0.5	<0.5	<0.5	<1	8	12	<0.5	<0.5	<0.5	8	62	<0.5	<1
Udmurtia	33	2	<0.5	1.4	<0.5	<0.5	5	29	19	4	<0.5	<1	2	<0.5	<0.5	<1

Religions by krai

	Russian Orthodox	Other Orthodox	Old Believers	Protestants	Catholics	Pentecostals	Simply Christians	Unaffiliated Believers	Atheists	Simply Muslims	Sunni Muslims	Shia Muslims	Pagans / Tengrists	Buddhists	Religious Jews	Other
Altai	23	1.4	<1	<0.5	<0.5	<0.5	3	31	27	1	<1	<0.5	<1	<0.5	<0.5	<1
Kamchatka	31	<1	<1	<0.5	<0.5	<0.5	4	23	21	1	<0.5	<1	2.4	<0.5	<1	<1
Khabarovsk	26	1	<0.5	<0.5	<0.5	<0.5	4	28	23	1	<0.5	<0.5	<0.5	<0.5	<0.5	2
Krasnodar	52	1	<1	<0.5	<0.5	<0.5	3	22	13	1	<1	<0.5	<1	<0.5	<0.5	1
Krasnoyarsk	30	2	<1	<1	<0.5	<0.5	5	35	15	1	<1	<1	<1	<0.5	<0.5	<0.5
Perm	43	1	<1	<0.5	<1	<0.5	5	24	14	4	<1	<0.5	1.5	<0.5	<0.5	<1
Primorsky	27	1.4	<1	<0.5	<1	<1	6	24	35	<0.5	<1	<0.5	<1	<0.5	<0.5	<1
Stavropol	47	<1	<0.5	<0.5	<0.5	<0.5	7	19	16	1	1	<0.5	1.3	<0.5	<0.5	<0.5
Zabaykalsky	25	2	<0.5	<0.5	<0.5	<0.5	6	28	17	<0.5	<0.5	<0.5	<1	6	<0.5	<0.5

Religions by oblast

	Russian Orthodox	Other Orthodox	Old Believers	Protestants	Catholics	Pentecostals	Simply Christians	Unaffiliated Believers	Atheists	Simply Muslims	Sunni Muslims	Shia Muslims	Pagans / Tengrists	Buddhists	Religious Jews	Other
Amur	25	<1	<0.5	<1	<0.5	<0.5	5	41	24	1	<0.5	<0.5	<0.5	<1	<0.5	<1
Arkhangelsk	29	1	<0.5	<1	<0.5	<1	6	32	16	<0.5	<0.5	<0.5	1	<0.5	<0.5	2
Astrakhan	46	4	<0.5	<0.5	<0.5	<0.5	2	16	6	11	3	<1	2	<1	<0.5	1
Belgorod	50	1	<1	<1	<0.5	<0.5	8	22	10	<0.5	<1	<0.5	<0.5	<0.5	<0.5	<0.5
Bryansk	50	1	<1	<1	<0.5	<0.5	5	36	5	<0.5	<0.5	<0.5	1	<0.5	<0.5	<1
Chelyabinsk	31	5	<1	<0.5	<0.5	<1	8	29	14	4	3	<1	<1	<0.5	<0.5	<1
Irkutsk	28	6	<0.5	<0.5	<0.5	<0.5	7	37	17	1	<1	<0.5	2	<1	<0.5	<1
Ivanovo	47	8	<0.5	<0.5	<0.5	<0.5	2	28	13	<0.5	<0.5	<0.5	1	<0.5	<0.5	<0.5
Kaliningrad	31	<1	<0.5	<0.5	1	<1	1	34	22	<0.5	<1	<0.5	<1	<0.5	<0.5	1
Kaluga	49	2	1	<0.5	<0.5	<0.5	7	26	9	<1	<0.5	<0.5	2	<0.5	<0.5	<0.5
Kemerovo	34	<1	<0.5	<0.5	<0.5	<0.5	7	31	17	1	<0.5	<0.5	2.6	<0.5	<0.5	<0.5
Kirov	40	1.3	1	<1	<0.5	<0.5	5	33	13	1	<0.5	<0.5	<0.5	<0.5	<0.5	<1
Kostroma	54	1	<1	<1	<0.5	<0.5	5	25	9	<1	<1	<0.5	1	<0.5	<0.5	<0.5
Kurgan	28	<1	<0.5	<1	<0.5	<0.5	6	36	14	2	<0.5	<0.5	1.4	<0.5	<0.5	2
Kursk	69	<0.5	<1	<1	<0.5	<0.5	<1	24	4	<0.5	<0.5	<0.5	<0.5	<0.5	<0.5	<0.5
Leningrad	55	1	1	<1	<1	<0.5	4	20	8	1	<0.5	<0.5	1	<1	<0.5	<0.5
Lipetsk	71	<0.5	<0.5	<0.5	<0.5	<0.5	3	15	6	1	<1	<0.5	1	<0.5	<0.5	<0.5
Magadan	30	3	1	<1	<0.5	<1	3	27	13	1	<1	<1	2	<0.5	<0.5	1.2
Moscow	45	2	<0.5	<0.5	<0.5	<0.5	3	29	9	1	<1	<0.5	1	<0.5	<0.5	1
Murmansk	42	1	<0.5	<0.5	<0.5	<0.5	3	28	12	1	<0.5	<0.5	<1	<0.5	<0.5	<0.5
Nizhny Novgorod	69	2	<0.5	<1	<0.5	<0.5	2	15	10	<0.5	<0.5	<0.5	<1	<0.5	<0.5	<0.5
Novgorod	47	<1	<0.5	<1	<0.5	<0.5	4	34	10	<0.5	<1	<0.5	<1	<0.5	<0.5	<0.5
Novosibirsk	25	<1	<0.5	<0.5	<0.5	<0.5	5	32	25	1	<0.5	<0.5	1	<1	<0.5	<0.5
Omsk	36	<0.5	<0.5	<1	<1	<0.5	3	39	13	2	<1	<1	<1	<0.5	<0.5	<0.5
Orenburg	40	2	<0.5	<1	<1	<0.5	3	20	12	12	1	<0.5	3	<0.5	<0.5	1.1
Oryol	41	1	1	<0.5	<1	<0.5	5	34	8	<0.5	<0.5	<0.5	1	<0.5	<0.5	<0.5
Penza	63	<1	<0.5	<0.5	<1	<0.5	2	15	9	5	1	<0.5	<1	<0.5	<0.5	<1
Pskov	50	2	1	<1	<1	<1	5	17	19	<0.5	<0.5	<0.5	1	<0.5	<0.5	<0.5
Rostov	50	<1	<0.5	<0.5	<1	<0.5	6	26	12	1	<0.5	<0.5	<1	<0.5	<0.5	1
Ryazan	63	1	<0.5	<0.5	<0.5	<0.5	3	15	9	1	<1	<0.5	1	<0.5	<0.5	2
Sakhalin	22	2	<0.5	1	<0.5	<0.5	4	37	15	<0.5	<0.5	<0.5	1	<0.5	<0.5	1
Samara	35	1.3	<1	<0.5	<0.5	<0.5	7	30	13	2	<0.5	<0.5	<1	<0.5	<0.5	1.5
Saratov	30	<1	<0.5	<1	<1	<0.5	4	38	16	2	<1	<0.5	1.1	<0.5	<0.5	<1
Smolensk	29	3	2	<1	<0.5	<0.5	7	45	13	<0.5	<1	<0.5	1	<0.5	<0.5	1
Sverdlovsk	33	1.3	<0.5	<1	<1	<0.5	2.9	36	13	5.3	1.8	<0.5	<0.5	<1	<0.5	<0.5
Tambov	78	<0.5	<1	<0.5	<0.5	<0.5	1	7	10	<0.5	<0.5	<0.5	<0.5	<0.5	<0.5	<0.5
Tomsk	33	2	<1	<1	<0.5	<1	4	29	15	1	<1	<0.5	1.7	<1	<0.5	<1
Tver	30	<1	<0.5	<0.5	<0.5	<0.5	9	34	20	1	<0.5	<0.5	<0.5	<0.5	<0.5	<0.5
Tula	62	<0.5	<0.5	<0.5	<0.5	<0.5	2	19	13	1	<1	<0.5	<0.5	<0.5	<0.5	<0.5
Tyumen	29	9	<0.5	1	<1	<0.5	4	34	11	4	2	<1	2	<0.5	<0.5	1.1
Ulyanovsk	61	<1	<0.5	<1	<0.5	<0.5	1	12	8	6	<1	<0.5	<1	<0.5	<0.5	<1
Vladimir	42	1	<0.5	<0.5	<0.5	<0.5	5	32	14	<1	<0.5	<1	1	<0.5	<0.5	<0.5
Volgograd	54	2	<0.5	<0.5	<0.5	<0.5	4	18	12	3	<0.5	<1	<1	<0.5	<0.5	<0.5
Vologda	30	1	1	<0.5	<0.5	<0.5	2	39	20	<0.5	<0.5	<0.5	1	<0.5	<0.5	1
Voronezh	62	<1	<1	<0.5	<0.5	<0.5	3	22	6	<1	<0.5	<0.5	<0.5	<0.5	<0.5	1
Yaroslavl	33	2	<0.5	<0.5	<0.5	<0.5	5	1	<0.5	<0.5	<0.5	<0.5	<0.5	<0.5	<0.5	<0.5

Religions by federal city, autonomous oblast, autonomous okrug

	Russian Orthodox	Other Orthodox	Old Believers	Protestants	Catholics	Pentecostals	Simply Christians	Unaffiliated Believers	Atheists	Simply Muslims	Sunni Muslims	Shia Muslims	Pagans / Tengrists	Buddhists	Religious Jews	Other
Federal cities
Moscow	53	2	1	<1	<0.5	<0.5	3	19	12	1	2	<1	1	<0.5	<0.5	1
Saint Petersburg	50	1	<1	<0.5	<0.5	<0.5	3	21	15	2	<1	<0.5	<1	<0.5	<0.5	<0.5
Autonomous oblast
Jewish	23	6	<1	<1	<0.5	<0.5	9	35	22	<1	<1	<1	<1	<0.5	<1	<1
Autonomous okrug
Chukotka	n/a	n/a	n/a	n/a	n/a	n/a	n/a	n/a	n/a	n/a	n/a	n/a	n/a	n/a	n/a	n/a
Khanty-Mansi	38	<1	<0.5	<0.5	<1	<0.5	5	23	11	5	5	<0.5	<1	<0.5	<0.5	<1
Nenets	n/a	n/a	n/a	n/a	n/a	n/a	n/a	n/a	n/a	n/a	n/a	n/a	n/a	n/a	n/a	n/a
Yamalo-Nenets	42	1	<0.5	<0.5	<0.5	<0.5	14	14	8	13	4	1	1	<0.5	<0.5	1

=== Religions by ethnic group ===
Distribution of religions among the major ethnic groups in Russia, in percentage (Arena Atlas 2012)
	Russian Orthodox	Other Orthodox	Old Believers	Protestants	Catholics	Pentecostals	Simply Christians	Unaffiliated Believers	Atheists	Simply Muslims	Sunni Muslims	Shia Muslims	Pagans / Tengrists	Buddhists	Religious Jews	Hindus
Ethnic Russians	46	1.5	<1	<1	0	0	4.3	27	14	0	0	0	<1	0	0	0
Tatars	1	<1	0	0	0	0	0	1	2	60	36	1.3	0	0	0	<1
Ukrainians	45	2	<1	<1	<1	0	7	26	12	<1	0	0	<1	0	0	0
Chuvashes	58	4	<1	0	0	0	2	22	8	0	<1	0	2	0	0	0
Bashkirs	1	0	0	<1	<1	0	1	1	3	92	2	<1	1	<1	0	<1
Armenians	35	7	0	0	1.8	0	13	25	7	1	<1	0	<1	0	0	0
Avars	0	0	0	0	0	0	0	0	1	16	83	<1	0	0	0	0
Mordvins	60	0	0	0	0	0	7	14	12	0	0	0	<1	0	0	0
Germans	18	2	0	3.2	7.2	1.2	5	34	18	0	0	0	2	0	0	0
Ethnic Jews	13	0	0	0	0	0	4	25	27	0	0	0	3	4	13	0
Kazakhs	1	0	0	0	0	0	0	3	2	85	8	1	0	0	0	<1
Belarusians	46	4.6	1.4	<1	1.3	0	3	20	15	1	0	0	0	0	0	<1
All Russians	41	1.5	0.3	0.2	0.1	0.1	4.1	25	13	4.7	1.7	0.2	1.2	0.5	0.1	0.1

=== Religious observance ===
In addition to the respondents’ nominal self-determination of their religious affiliation, experts are also interested in the degree of real religiosity ("religious observance", “church-going”) of Russian residents. Based on this principle, very few Russians would be religious. It has been found that between 0.5% and 2% of people in big cities attend Easter services, and overall just between 2% and 10% of the total population (3 to 15 million people) are actively practising Orthodox Christians. The proportion of practising Muslims among ethnic groups which are historically Islamic is larger, 40% to 90% depending on the group, and yet smaller than any assumption based on the ethnic principle.

In contrast to the above data, in a 2025 survey conducted by the Russian Public Opinion Research Center among believers, the degree of religiosity was determined by the number of religious practices performed (wearing religious attributes, praying, observing fasts, visiting and helping temples, reading spiritual books, and so on). As a result, the majority of Russians turned out to be practicing believers:

Percent of Russians who	Regularly	Sometimes	Never	No answer
Wear religious symbols (a cross, a crescent moon, etc.)	53%	13%	33%	1%
Live according to religious commandments	49%	36%	11%	4%
Celebrate religious holidays	49%	42%	8%	1%
Pray	28%	47%	25%	0%
Go to church, mosque, etc.	13%	65%	20%	2%
Read spiritual literature	11%	45%	44%	0%
Observe fasting	10%	28%	61%	1%
Communicate with a confessor, spiritual mentor	8%	38%	53%	1%
Help out at church, mosque, etc.	8%	34%	57%	1%
Participate in church sacraments and rituals	7%	39%	52%	2%

According to a 2026 Levada Center poll, a majority of Russians do not take part in religious services. Overall, 55% said they never attend, while 16% reported attending regularly. Among younger people, the share who never attend rises to 68%.

- Several times a week – 2%
- Once a week – 3%
- Several times a month – 3%
- Once a month – 7%
- Several times a year – 16%
- Once a year – 7%
- Less than once a year – 7%
- Never – 55%

=== Other surveys ===
- A 2026 survey by the Saint Tikhon's Orthodox University (PSTGU) found that 65% of respondents in Russia identified as Orthodox, while 22% identified as non-religious or atheist, 9% as Muslim, and 3% as belonging to other religions; 1% did not provide an answer. The survey indicated a decline in Orthodox identification from 78% in 2011 and 67% in 2020.
- In 2025, VCIOM found that 67% of Russians identified as Orthodox Christians, 7% were Muslims, 1% were Buddhists, 1% were Protestant Christians, <1% were Catholic Christians, <1% were Jews, 3% were unaffiliated believers, 4% were unsure about their belief or no religion, 11% were atheists, 4% were of other and 2% had no answer.
- In 2024, the Public Opinion Foundation (FOM) found that 62% of Russians identify as Orthodox Christians, 3% as other Christians, 9% as Muslims, 21% as not religious, 1% follow other religions and 4% are unsure about their belief. According to the survey, Orthodoxy is more widespread among women (65%), people aged 60 and older (70%), and people living in the central (74%) and southern (70%) federal districts.
- According to a 2023 survey conducted by the Russian Public Opinion Research Center (VCIOM), 66% of respondents in Russia said they believed in God, while 24% said they did not and 10% declined to answer. The survey also found differences by gender and age: 73% of women reported believing in God, compared with 56% of men. Belief was lower among younger respondents; among those aged 18-24, 45% said they believed in God, 48% said they did not, and 7% declined to answer.
- In 2020, the Levada Center estimated that 63% of Russians were Orthodox Christians, less than 1% were Catholics, Protestants and religious Jews, 7% were Muslims, 2% belonged to other religions, 26% were not religious and 2% were unsure about their belief.
- In 2018, according to a study jointly conducted by London's St Mary's University's Benedict XVI Centre for Religion and Society and the Institut Catholique de Paris, and based on data from the European Social Survey 2014–2016, Christianity is declining in Russia like in Western Europe. Among the 16 to 29 years-old Russians, 41% were Christians (40% Orthodox and 1% Protestant), 10% were of other religions (9% Muslim and 1% other), and 49% were not religious.
- In 2017 Gallup released a poll stating 61% of Russians regard themselves as Religious, while 23% of Russians regarded themselves as not religious, while 7% regarded themselves as convinced Atheist while the remaining 9% didn't state their Religious beliefs.
- The 2017 Survey Religious Belief and National Belonging in Central and Eastern Europe made by the Pew Research Center showed that 73% of Russians declared themselves Christians—including 71% Orthodox, 1% Catholic, and 2% Other Christians, while 15% were unaffiliated, 10% were Muslims, and 1% were from other religions. According to the same study, Christianity experienced significant increase since the fall of the USSR in 1991, and more Russians say they are Christian now (73%) than say they were raised Christian (65%).
- In 2016, Ipsos Global Trends, a multi-nation survey held by Ipsos and based on approximately 1,000 interviews, found that Christianity is the religion of 63% of the working-age, internet connected population of Russia; 62% stated they were Orthodox Christians, and 1% stated they were Catholic. While 21% stated they were not religious, and 1% stated they were Muslims.
- In 2015, the Pew Research Center estimated that 71% of Russians were Orthodox Christians, 15% were not religious, 10% were Muslim, 2% were Christians of other denominations, and 1% belonged to other religions. At the same time, the centre published data from the European Social Survey 2004–2012 showing that the proportion of Orthodox Christians in Russia remained stable between 41% just after 2004, 46–50% around 2008, and 45% around 2012.
- In 2015, the International Social Survey Programme estimated that 79.4% of Russians were Christians (78.3% Orthodox, 0.9% Catholics and 0.2% Protestants), 14.0% were not religious, 6.2% were Muslims, 0.1% were religious Jews, 0.1% were Hindus, and 0.3% belonged to other religions.
- In 2013, the Russian Academy of Sciences estimated that 79% of Russians were Orthodox Christians, 4% were Muslims, 9% were spiritual but not identifying themselves with any religion and 7% were atheists.
- In 2011, the Pew Research Center estimated that 73.6% of Russians were Christians.
- The European Social Survey 2007–2009 found that 45% of Russians were Orthodox, 8% were Muslims, and 47% declared themselves not religious.
- In 2008, the International Social Survey Programme estimated that 72% of the Russians were Orthodox, 18% were not religious, and 6% adhered to other religions. However, people who did not respond were not counted.
- According to the Russian Analytical Centre for Sociology of Interethnic and Regional Relations (ISPI), the proportion of believers of the two largest religions in Russia remained stable between 1993 and 2000; Orthodox Christianity fluctuated between 46% in 1993, over 50% in the mid-1990s, and 49% in 2000, while Islam fluctuated between 7% in 1993 and 9% in 2000.

== Christianity ==
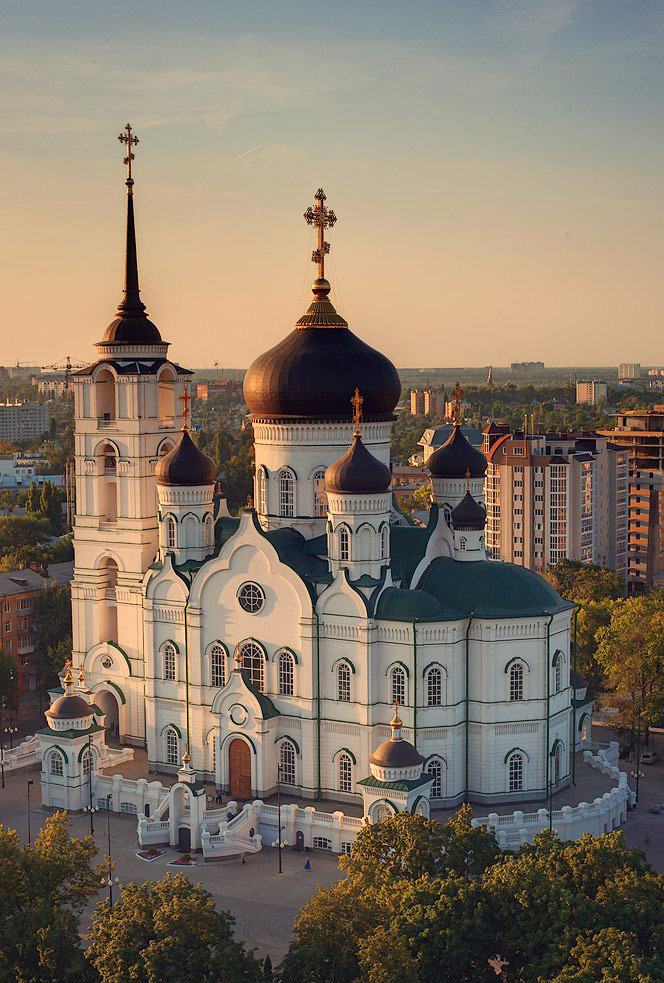
Russian Orthodox Annunciation Cathedral in Voronezh.

Russia's largest religion is Christianity. Christianity was the religious self-identification of 47.1% of the Russian population in 2012. Other polls give different results: regarding the total number of Christians in Russia by 2020 the Pew Research Center counted 102,4 million people or 69,9% of the population (in 2011 it estimated 71%); in the same year 2020 the Levada Center estimated that 63% of Russians were Christians; in 2020 the Public Opinion Foundation estimated that 63% of the population was Christian; in 2011 Ipsos MORI estimated that 69% of Russians were Christians; and in 2021 the Russian Public Opinion Research Center (VCIOM) estimated that ~67% of Russians were Christians.

Orthodox Christianity, including Old Believers, is the dominant religion of the country, and, besides it, Lutheranism also has had a considerable role in the multiethnic history of Russia. Evangelicalism and Catholicism (among Russians) are relatively recent additions to Christianity in Russia.

=== Eastern Orthodoxy ===
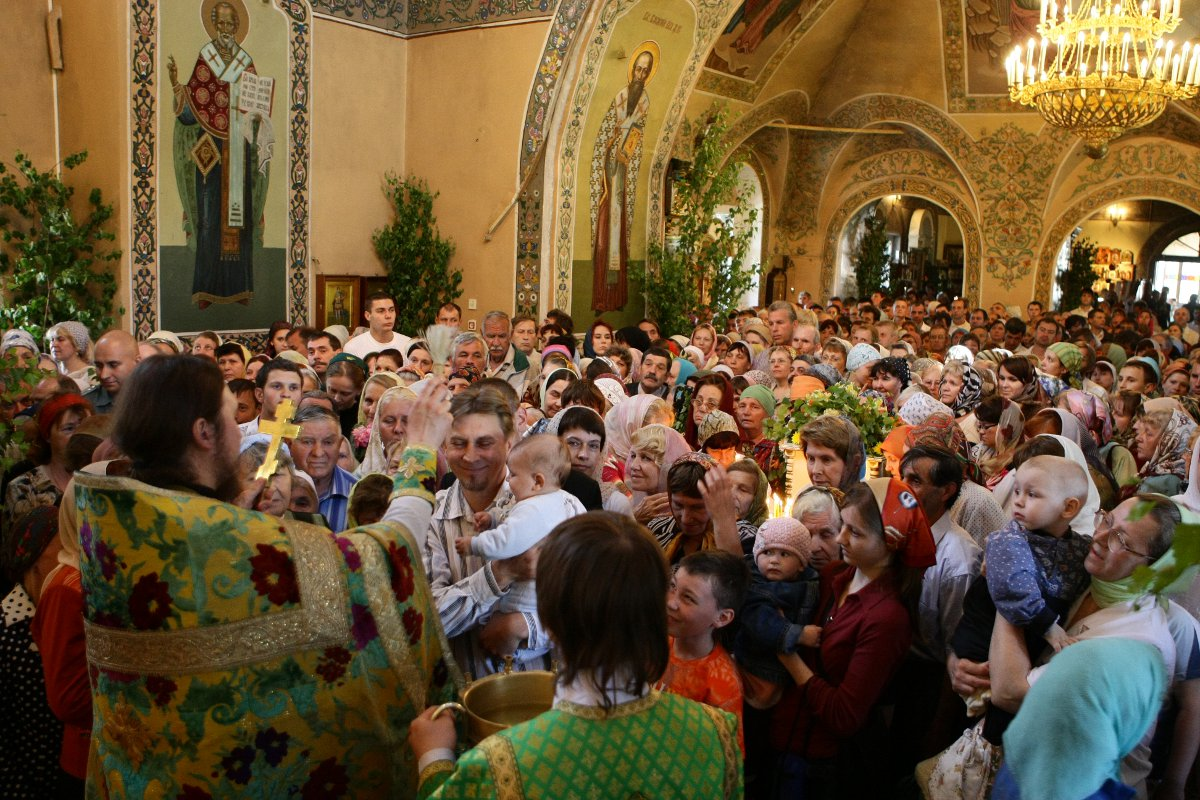
Trinity Sunday in Russia

Russia has the world's largest Orthodox population.

In accordance with some reference books, Christian Orthodoxy is professed by about 75% of Russia's believers. According to the Arena Atlas Survey, Orthodox Christian believers constituted 42.6% of the total population of Russia in 2012, while according to survey by the Pew Forum in 2017, Orthodox Christian believers constituted 71% of the total population of Russia.

In terms of their ethnicity, Orthodox are not only the majority of believers of the Russians and many indigenous peoples of Russia (Karelians, Mari, Mordvins, Komi, Chuvash, Ossetians, Khakassians, Yakuts and others), but also large diasporas of Belarusians, Georgians, Moldovans and Ukrainians in Russia. Among some non-Orthodox Russian peoples there are ethnoreligious groups professing Orthodoxy, such as: Kryashens among the Tatars, Mozdok Kabardins and Western Buryats.

Most of them were members of the Russian Orthodox Church, while small minorities were Old Believers and Orthodox Christian believers who either did not belong to any church or belonged to non-Russian Orthodox churches (including the Georgian Orthodox Church). Unaffiliated Orthodox Christians or non-Russian Orthodox Christians were 1.5% (2,100,000) of the total population. Minor Orthodox Christian churches are represented among ethnic minorities of Ukrainians and Georgians. Unaffiliated Orthodox Christians and minorities of non-Russian Orthodox Christians comprised over 4% of the population in Tyumen Oblast (9%), Irkutsk Oblast (6%), the Jewish Autonomous Oblast (6%), Chelyabinsk Oblast (5%), Astrakhan Oblast (4%) and Chuvashia (4%). Cossacks, historically and some of them also in modern Russia, are among the fiercer supporters of Orthodox theocratic monarchism.

==== Russian Orthodoxy ====
Church of the Savior on Blood in Saint Petersburg

In 2012, 58,800,000 people or 41% of the total population of Russia declared to believe in the Russian Orthodox Church. It was the religion of 21% to 40% of the population in most of the federal subjects of the country, with peaks of 41% to over 60% in Western Russia, including 41% to 60% in Yamalia and Perm Krai and over 60% in Kursk Oblast (69%), Voronezh Oblast (62%), Lipetsk Oblast (71%), Tambov Oblast (78%), Penza Oblast (63%), Ulyanovsk Oblast (61%), Mordovia (69%) and Nizhny Novgorod Oblast (69%).

The contemporary Russian Orthodox Church (the Moscow Patriarchate; Russkaia Pravoslavnaia Tserkov'), despite legally dating back only to 1949, claims to be the direct successor of the pre-revolutionary Orthodox Russian Church (Pravoslavnaia Rossiskaia Tserkov'). There are also a variety of small Orthodox Christian churches which claim as well to be the direct successors of the pre-revolutionary religious body, including the Russian Orthodox Catholic Church and the Russian Orthodox Autonomous Church. There have often been disputes between these churches and the Russian Orthodox Church over the reappropriation of disused churches, with the Russian Orthodox Church winning most cases thanks to the complicity of secular authorities.

==== Old Believers ====
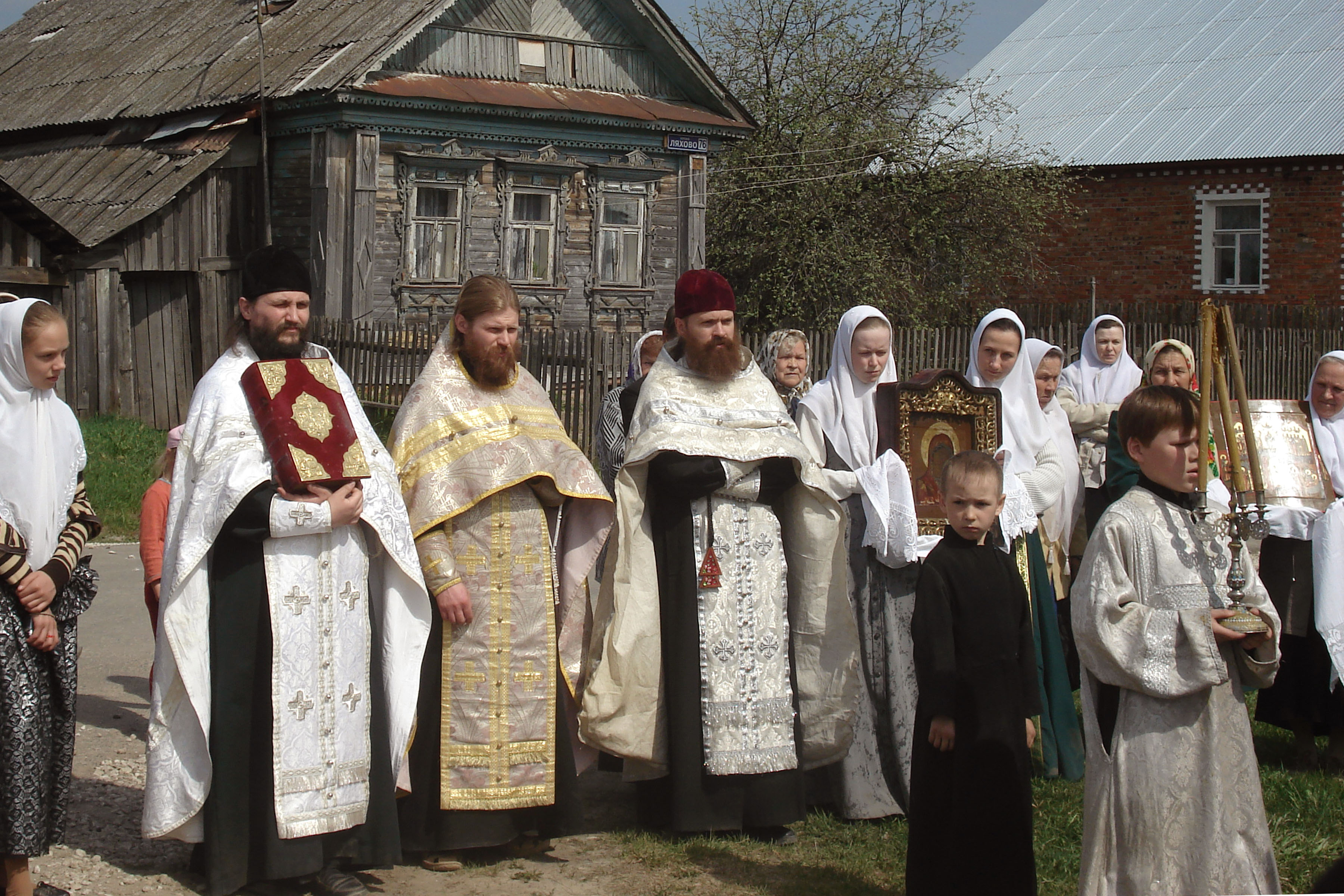
The communal Old Believers' service for the Bright Easter Week, Moscow Oblast

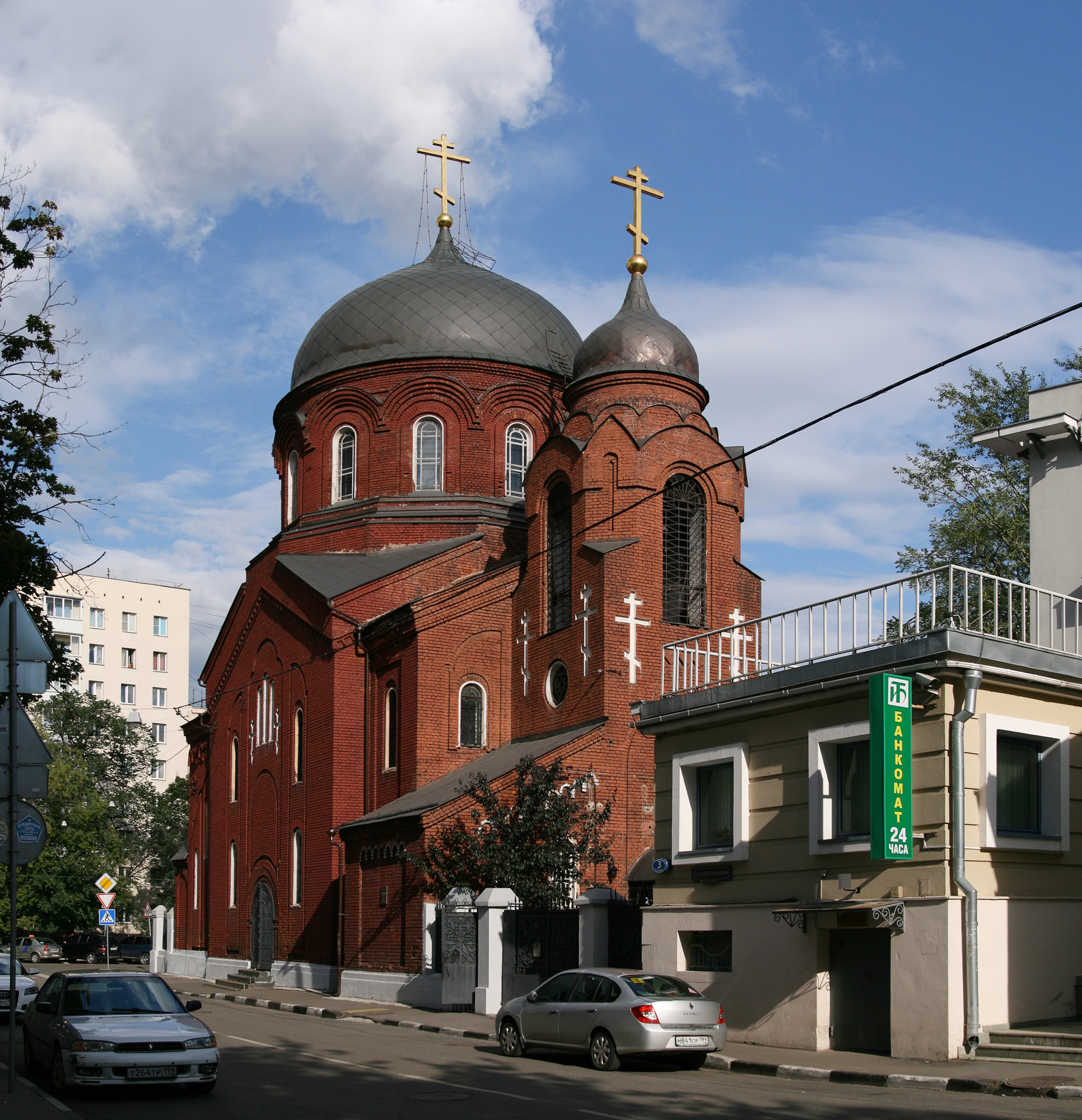
The Church of the Intercession cathedral of the Russian Old-Orthodox Church in Moscow

The Old Believers constituted 0.2% (400,000) of the total population of the country in 2012, with proportions higher than 1% only in Smolensk Oblast (1.6%), the Altai Republic (1.2%), Magadan Oblast (1%) and Mari El (1%). The Old Believers are the religious group which experienced the most dramatic decline since the end of the Russian Empire and throughout the Soviet Union. In the final years of the empire they constituted 10% of the population of Russia, while today their number has shrunk to far less than 1% and there are few descendants of Old Believers' families who feel a cultural link with the faith of their ancestors.

=== Oriental Orthodoxy ===
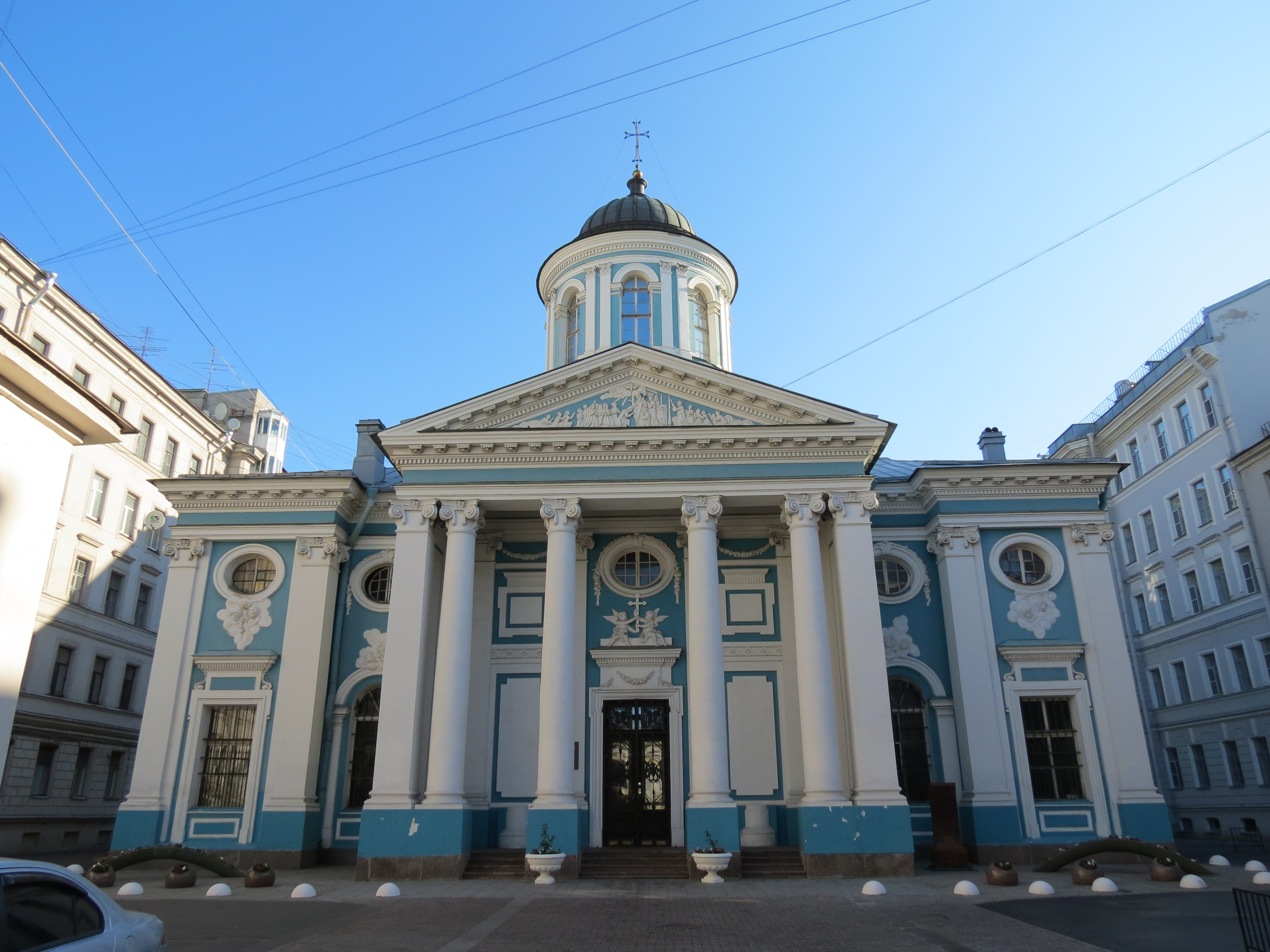
Armenian church of Saint Catherine in Saint Petersburg.

Oriental Orthodoxy is represented among such ethnic minority as the Armenians (the Armenian Apostolic Church).

=== Assyrian Church of the East ===
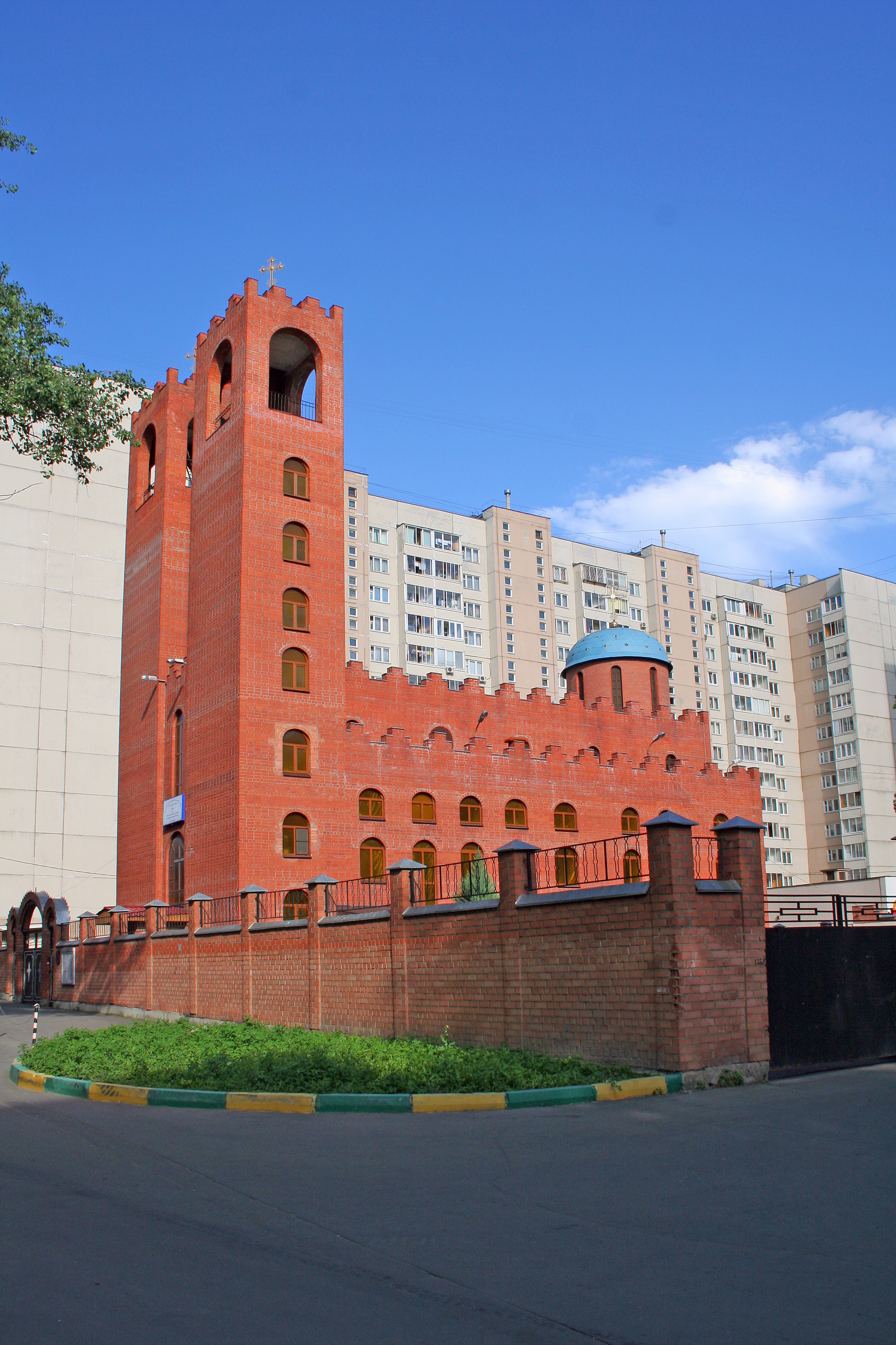
St. Mary Assyrian Church in Moscow.

Assyrians in Russia have long lived in the south of the country, as well as in Moscow. Most of them remain faithful to the Assyrian Church of the East and are subordinate to the Bishop of Baghdad, Russia and Georgia. In 1998, the Mat Maryam temple was built in Moscow.

=== Catholicism ===
Catholicism was the religion of 140,000 Russian citizens, about 0.1% of the total population, in 2012. They are concentrated in Western Russia with numbers ranging between 0.1% and 0.7% in most of the federal subjects of that region. The number of "ethnic Catholics" in Russia, that is to say Poles and Germans, and smaller minorities, is continually declining due to deaths, emigration, and secularisation. At the same time there has been a discrete rise of ethnic Russian converts to the Catholic Church.

The Archdiocese of Moscow administers the Latin Church of the Catholic Church in Russia. Further suffragan bishoprics exist in Irkutsk, Novosibirsk and Saratov. The Diocese of Irkutsk is in fact the largest Catholic bishopric on earth, covering an area of 9,960,000 squared kilometres. Almost all Russian Catholics are members of the Latin Church. However, the Catholic Church recognises the extremely small Russian Greek Catholic Church as a Byzantine Rite church sui juris ("of its own jurisdiction") in full communion with the Catholic Church. A small number of parishes and communities belonging to Armenian Catholic Church, Ukrainian Greek Catholic Church, and Belarusian Greek Catholic Church operate in Russia too.

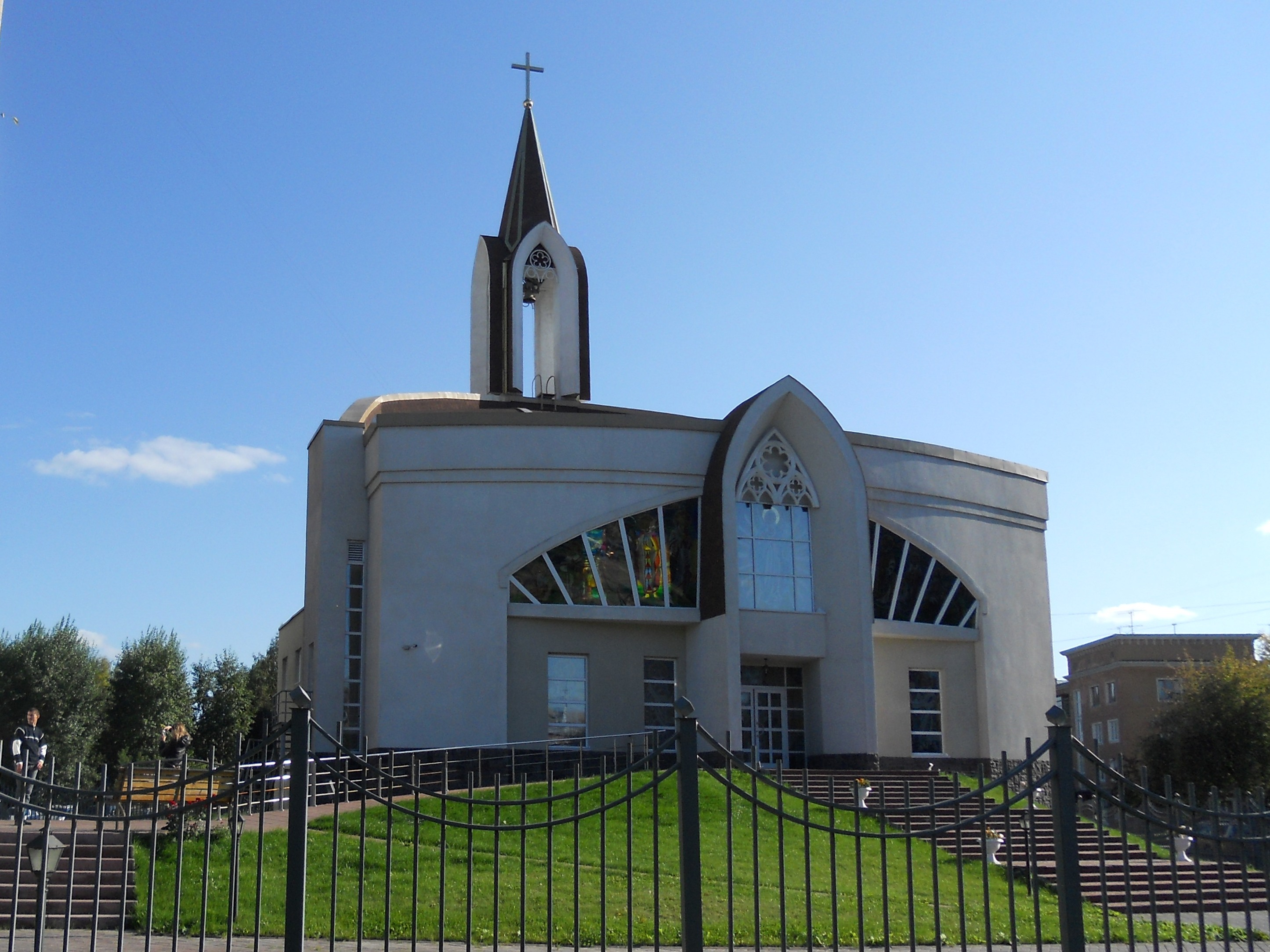
Catholic Church of the Immaculate Heart of the Blessed Virgin Mary in Kemerovo.

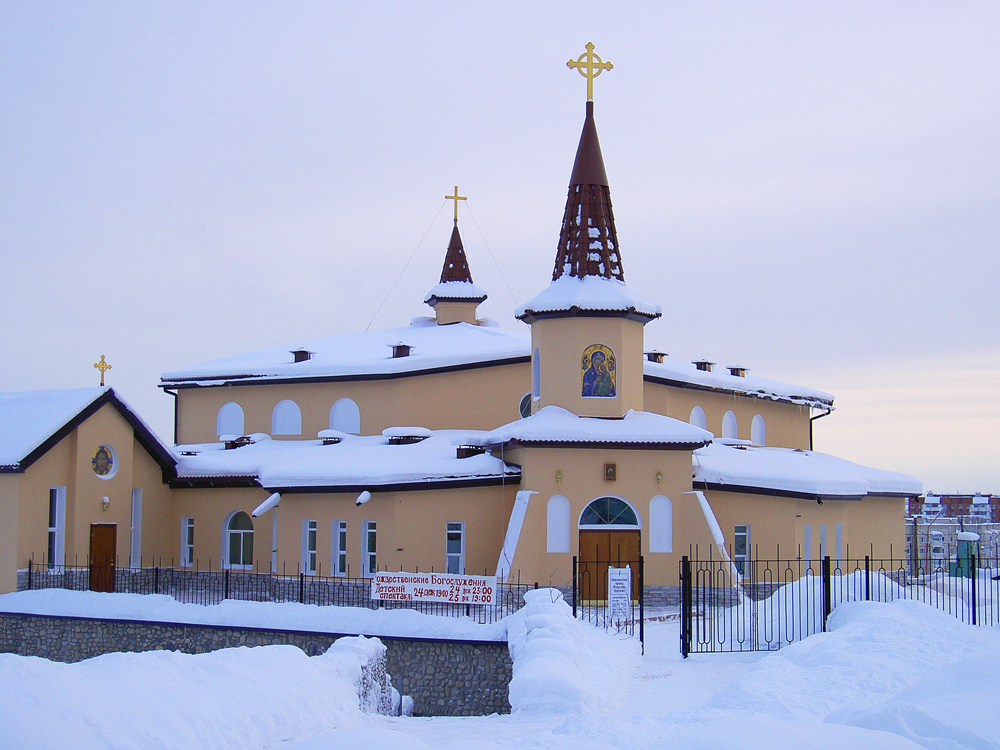
Catholic Church of the Nativity in Magadan.

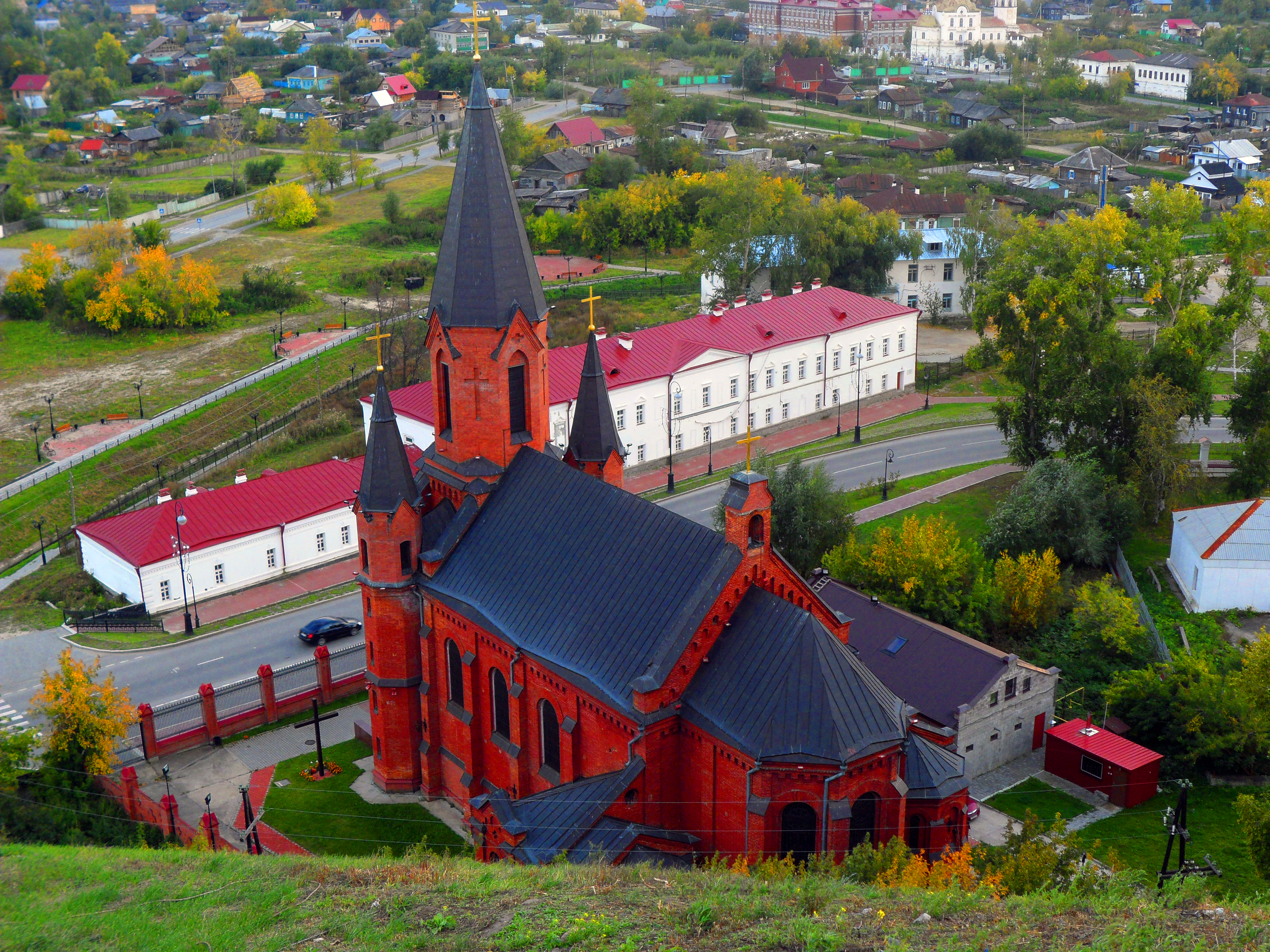
Catholic Church of the Holy Trinity in Tobolsk.

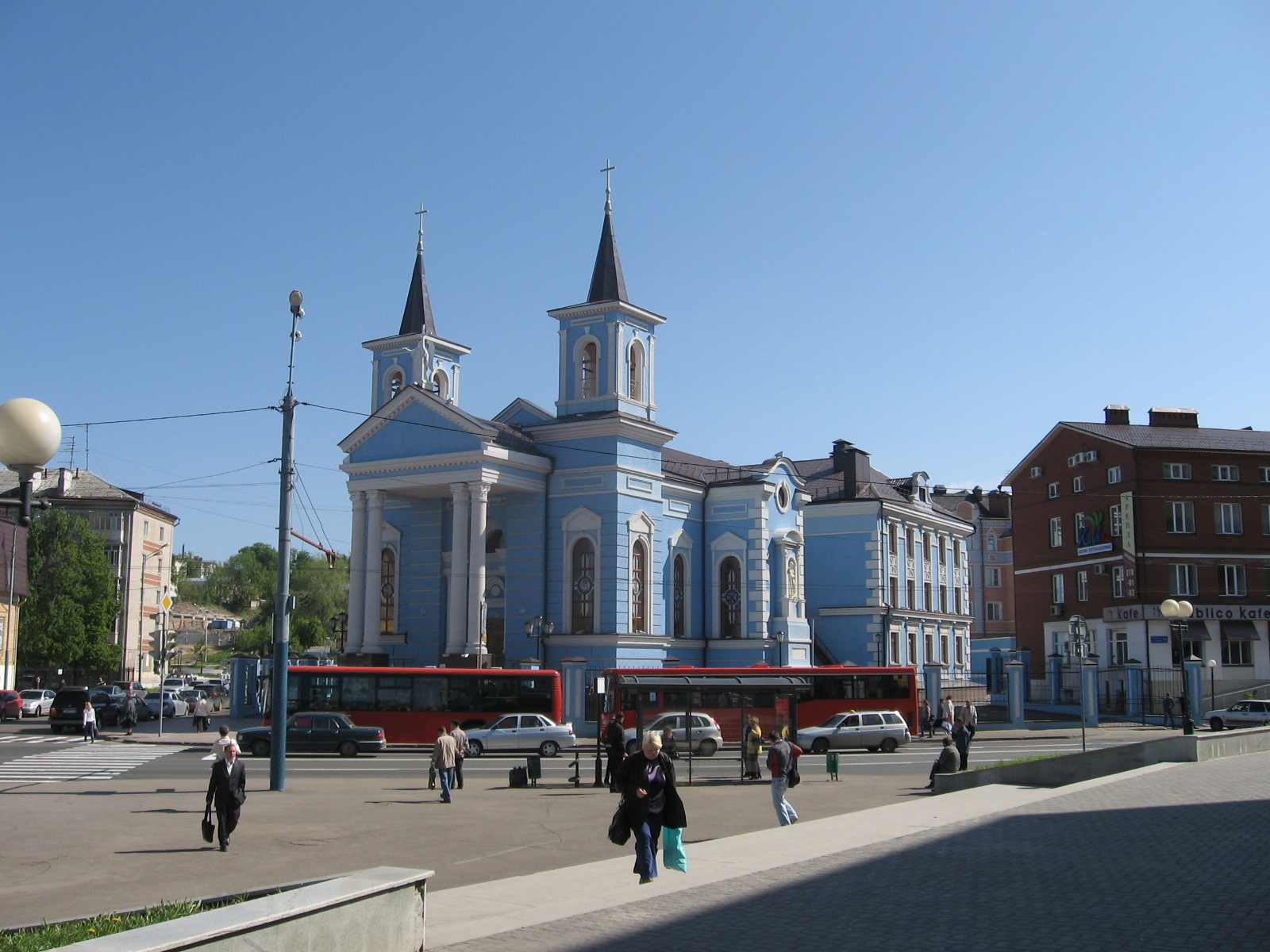
Catholic Church of the Exaltation of the Holy Cross in Kazan.

=== Protestantism and other Christians ===
Various denominations of Protestantism, both historical and Evangelical, as well as Pentecostalism, were the religion of 0.2% (300,000) of the population of Russia in 2012. Their number was slightly more than 1% only in Tuva (1.8%), Udmurtia (1.4%) and the Altai Republic (1%). At the same time, according to American encyclopedic data from 2008, the number of Protestants was 2 million, with 21% of religious organizations registered in Russia.

Lutheranism has been on a continuous decline among Finnish and German ethnic minorities, while it has seen some Russian converts, so that some traditionally Finnish churches, like the Evangelical Lutheran Church of Ingria, today have more Russian than Finnish believers. Adventists, Baptists (Russian Union of Evangelical Christians-Baptists and "Unregistered Baptists"), Evangelical Christians, Russian Mennonites, the New Apostolic Church, Presbyterians (mainly of Korean origin), Anglicans, Quakers, Disciples of Christ, Charismatics and Neo-charismatics. Methodists and Holiness movement (including The Salvation Army and the Church of the Nazarene) and Pentecostals are of relatively recent introduction, having at most 120 years of history in Russia. Such Evangelical movement as Messianic Jews has congregations in Moscow and Saint Petersburg.

Spiritual Christianity is the group of Russian movements, so-called folk Protestants. Their origins are varied: some were influenced by western Protestants, others from disgust of the behavior of official Orthodox priests. The Spiritual Christian movements are Khlysts (virtually extinct), Skoptsy (virtually extinct), Doukhobors, Molokans, and Spiritual Christian Teetotalers (Churikovites). The Tolstoyan movement was close to the Spiritual Christians.

Yehowists, a.k.a. the Message of Zion, is a Russian millenarian movement, that closed both to Spiritual Christianity and Judaism, founded in the 1840s.

People who considered themselves Christians without affiliation to any church or denomination formed 4.1% (5,900,000) of the population, with numbers ranging between 1% and 8% in most of Russia's federal subjects, and over 8% only in Nenetia (14%), North Ossetia–Alania (10%), Tver Oblast (9%) and the Jewish Autonomous Oblast (9%). Jehovah's Witnesses were estimated to have 255,000 believers in Russia in the mid-2000s.

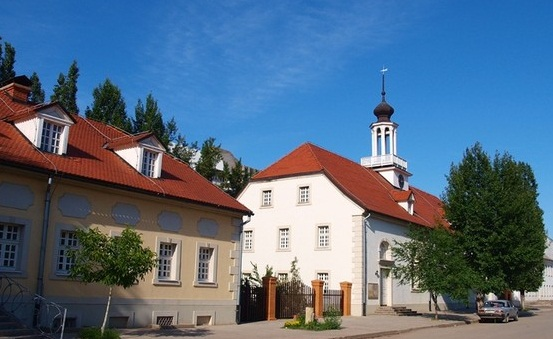
One of oldest Protestant in Russia, the Moravian Church in Old Sarepta, Volgograd

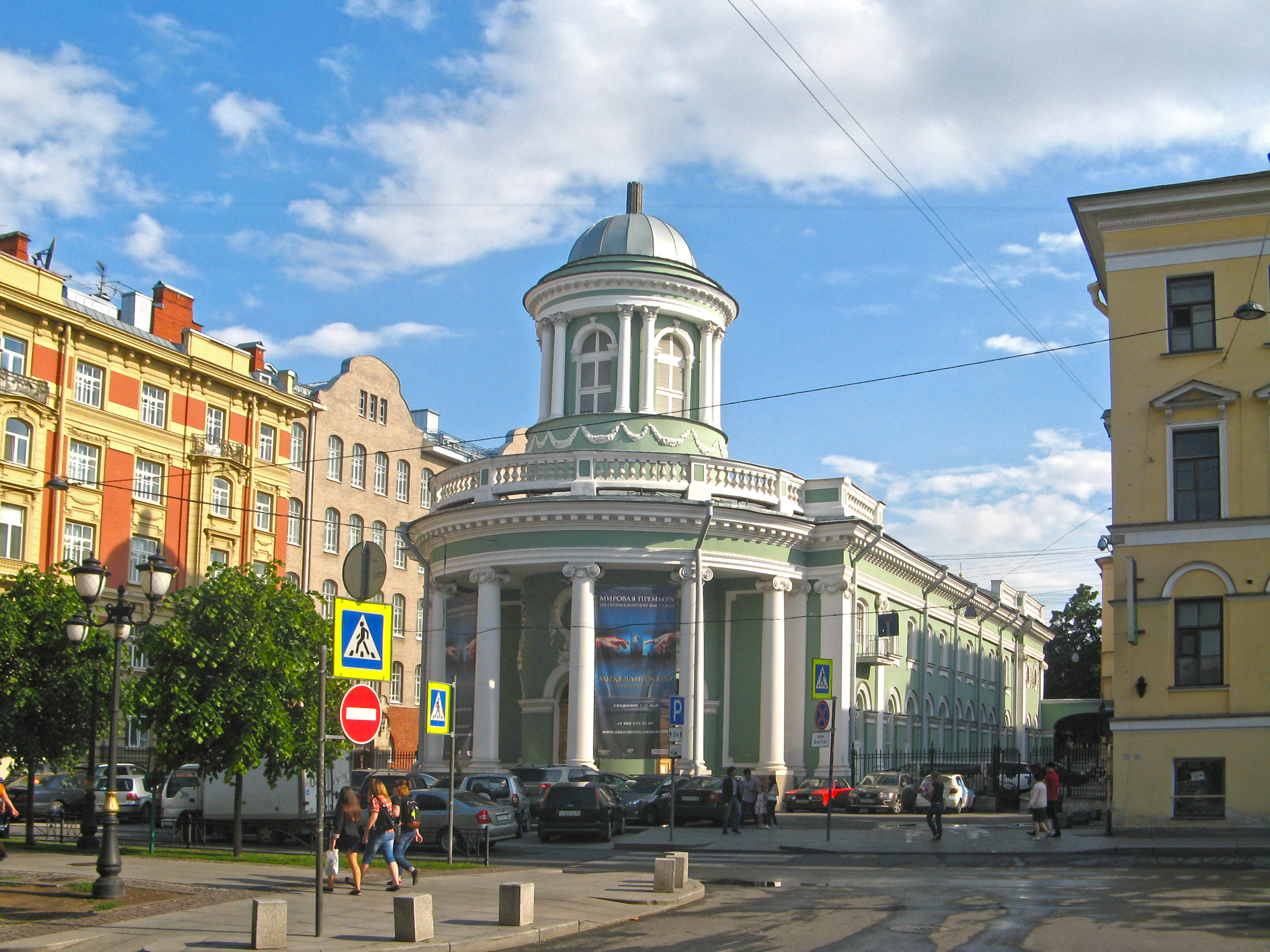
Lutheran Church of St. Anne in Saint Petersburg

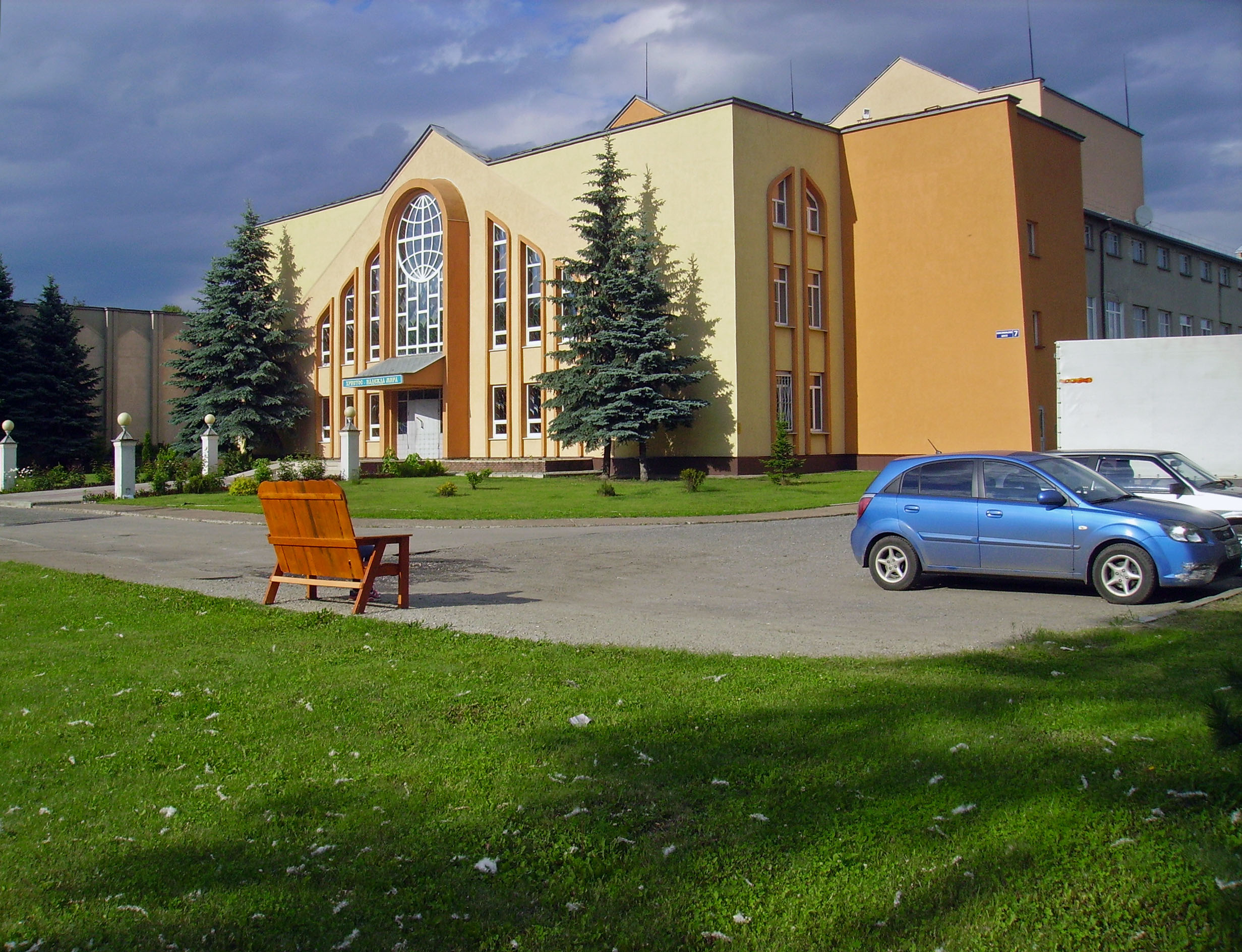
Seventh-day Adventist Church in Nizhny Novgorod

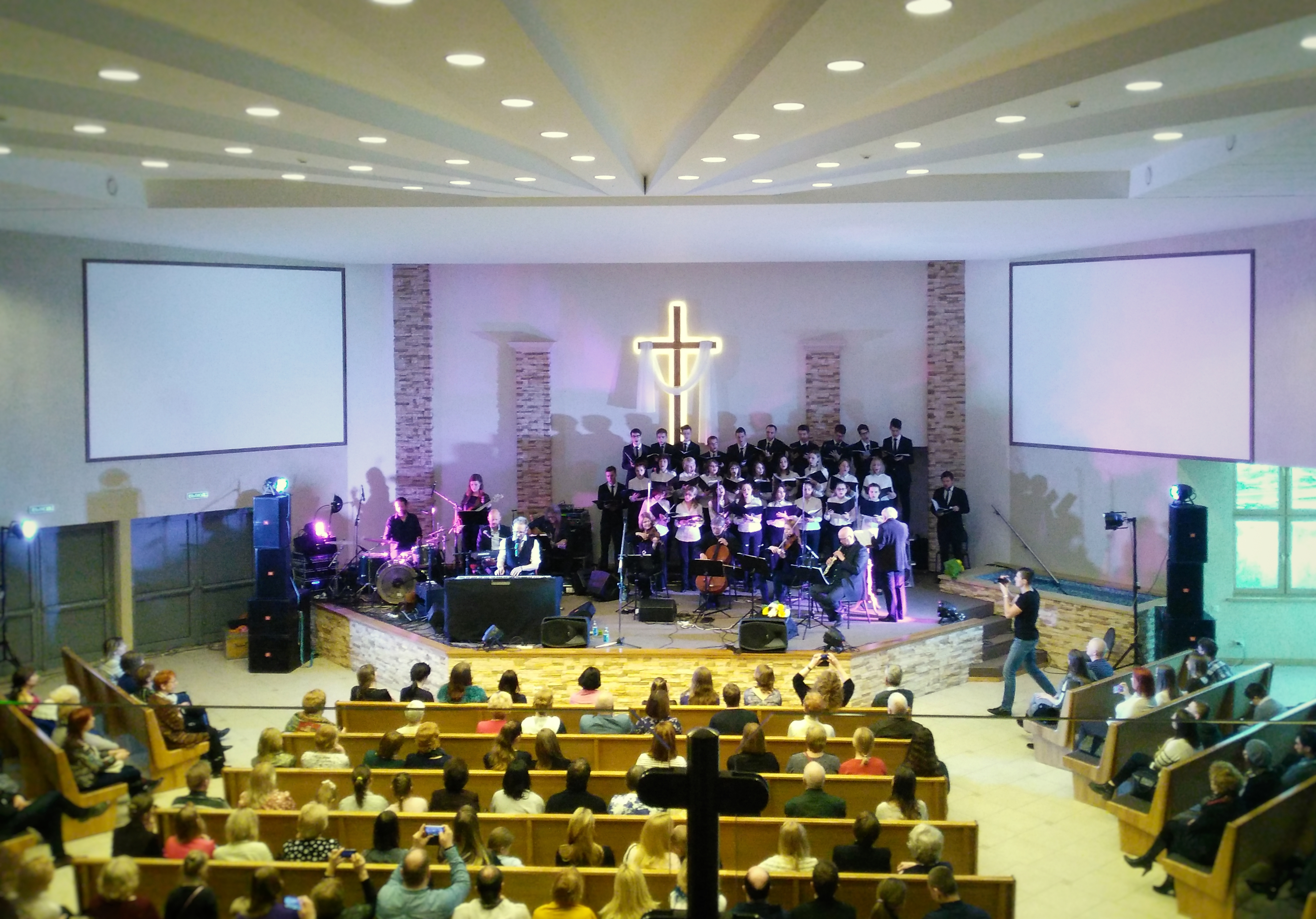
Performance in Murmansk Pentecostal Church

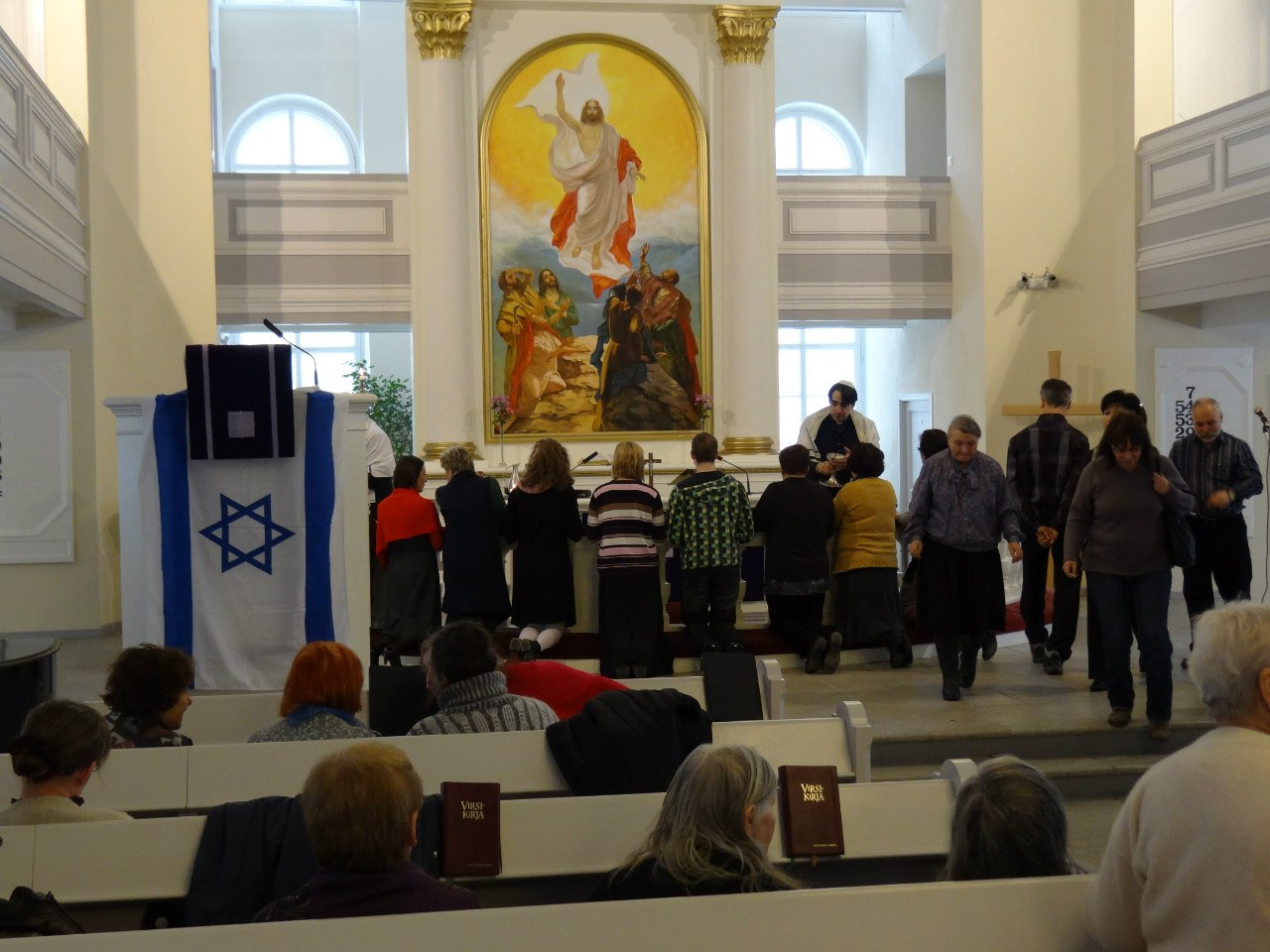
Purim of Messianic Jews in Saint Petersburg

== Other Abrahamic religions ==
=== Islam ===
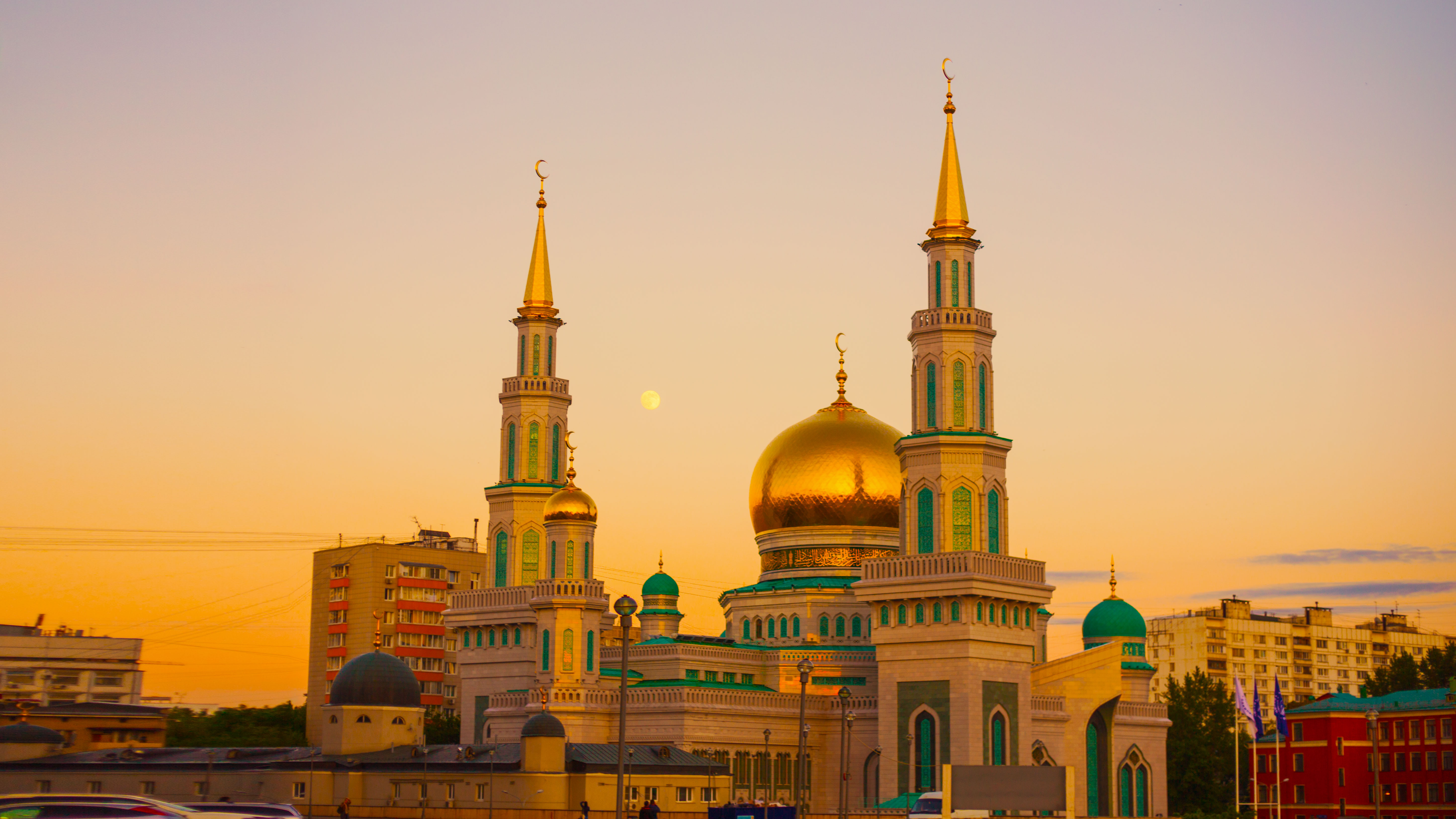
Moscow Cathedral Mosque.

Islam is the second largest religion in Russia after Orthodox Christianity. It is the historically dominant religion among some Caucasian ethnic groups (notably the Chechens, the Ingush and the Adyghe), and some Turkic peoples (notably the Tatars and the Bashkirs).

In accordance with some reference books, Islam is professed by about 19% of Russia's believers in the mid-1990s. In the 2012 Arena Atlas survey, Muslims in Russia were 9,400,000 or 6.5% of the total population. However, the Arena Atlas did not survey the populations of two federal subjects with Islamic majorities which together had a population of nearly 2 million, namely Chechnya and Ingushetia, thus the total number of Muslims may be slightly larger. Among these Muslims, 6,700,000 or 4.6% of the total population of Russia were not affiliated with any Islamic schools and branches. This is mainly because it is not essential for Muslims to be affiliated with any specific sect or organisation. Those who are unaffiliated are mostly Sunni Muslims. These unaffiliated Muslims constitute significant percentages of over 10% in Kabardino-Balkaria (50%), Bashkortostan (54%), Karachay-Cherkessia (50%), Tatarstan (51%), Dagestan (36%), Yamalia (13%), Orenburg Oblast (11%), Adygea (23%) and Astrakhan Oblast (11%). Most of the regions of Siberia have an unaffiliated Muslim population of 1% to 2%.

Sunni Islam was the religion of 2,400,000 of the Muslims, or 1.6% of the total population of Russia. It had significant following of more than 10% of the population only in Dagestan (60%) and Karachay-Cherkessia (13%). Percentages higher than 2% are found in Kabardino-Balkaria (10%), Yugra (Khantia-Mansia) (5%), Yamalia (4%), Astrakhan Oblast (3%), Chelyabinsk Oblast (3%) and Tyumen Oblast (2%). Yakutia had a population of Sunnis ranging between 1% and 2%. Many other federal subjects had a Muslim population of 0.1% to 0.9%. Shia Islam, otherwise, was a branch of 300,000 people, or 0.2% of the total population of Russia. It was primarily represented in Dagestan (2%), Adygea (1%), Karachay-Cherkessia (1%), Kabardino-Balkaria (1%), Novgorod Oblast (1%), Penza Oblast (1%), Tatarstan (1%) and Yugra (1%).

The federal subjects of Russia with an Islamic absolute majority—more than 50%—were Chechnya, Ingushetia, Dagestan (98%), Kabardino-Balkaria (60%), Tatarstan (51%), Karachay-Cherkessia (64%) and Bashkortostan (54%). Significant percentages (over 5%) were found in (38.6%), Yamalia (17.4%), Astrakhan Oblast (14.6%), Adygea (24%), Orenburg Oblast (13.9%) and Yugra (10.9%).

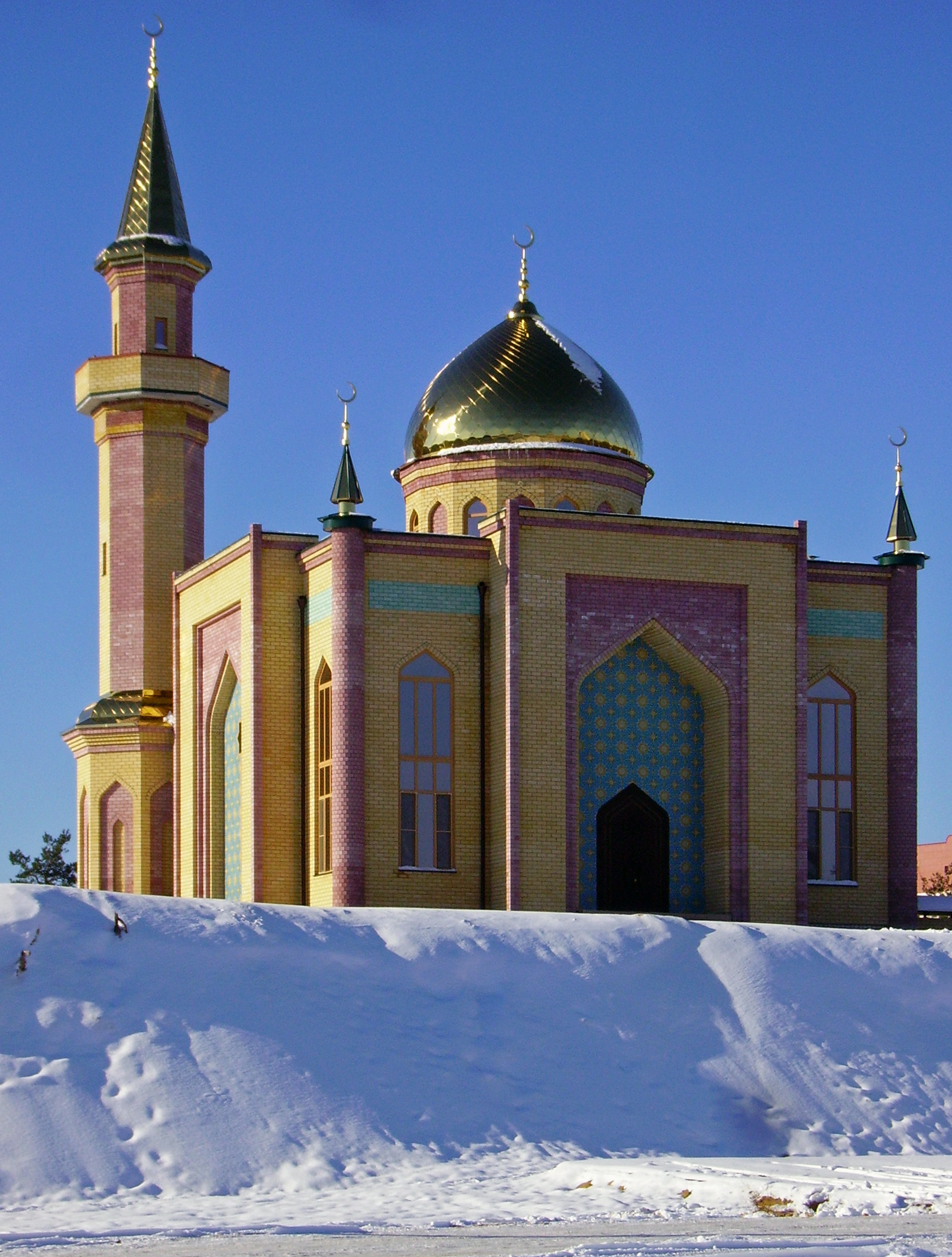
Mosque in Dzerzhinsk.

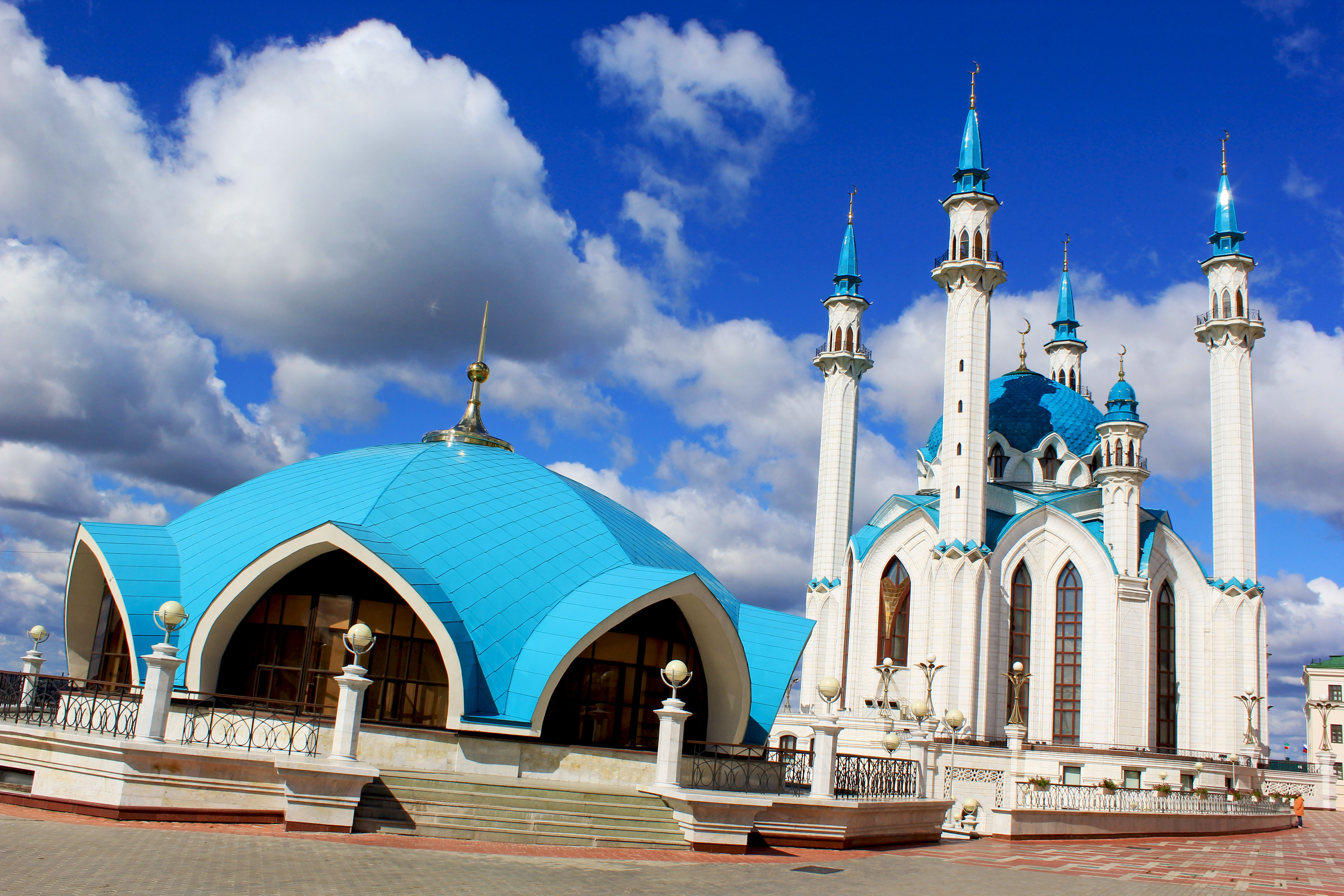
Qolsharif Mosque in Kazan.

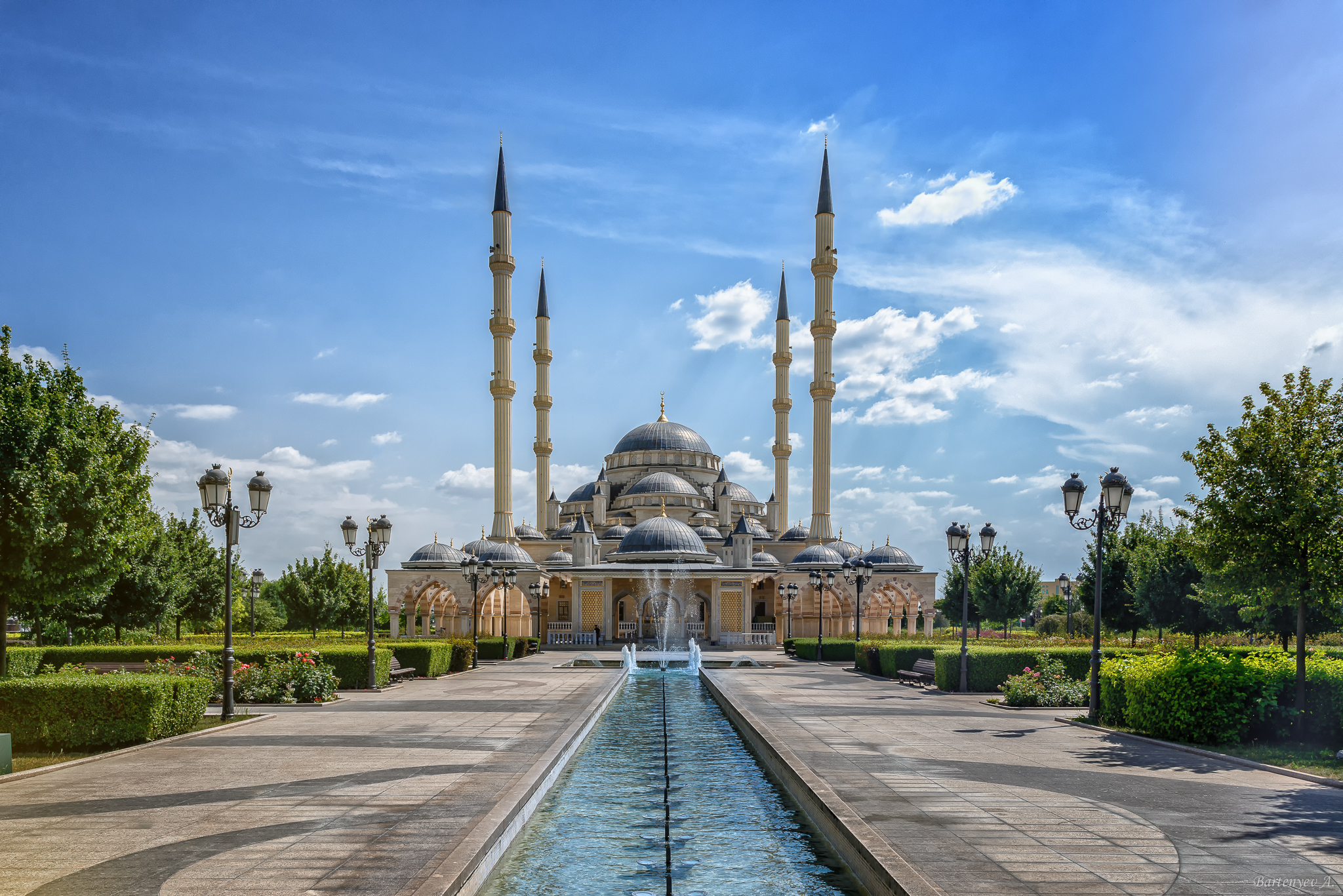
Akhmad Kadyrov Mosque in Grozny.

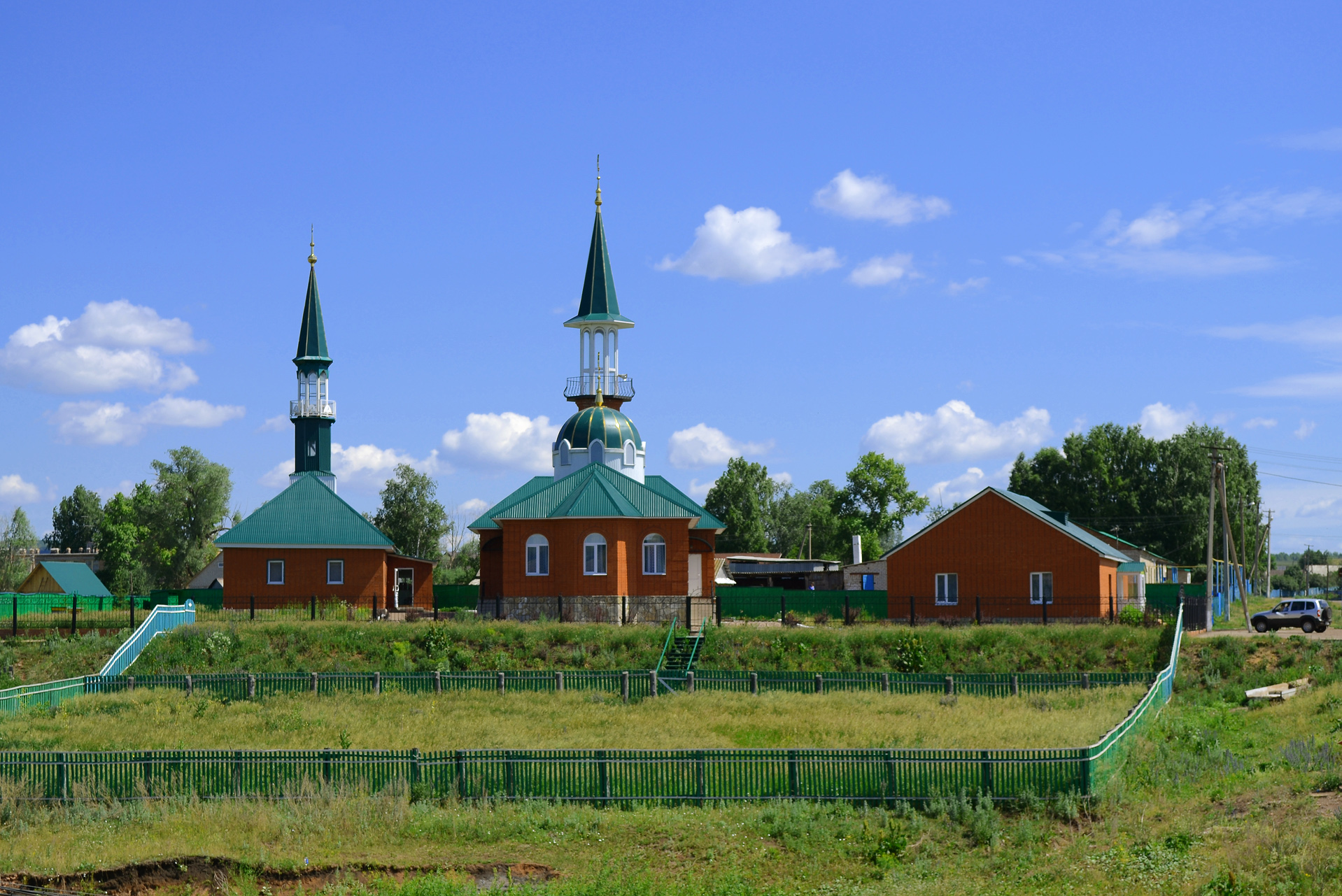
Mosque in Kinzebulatovo.

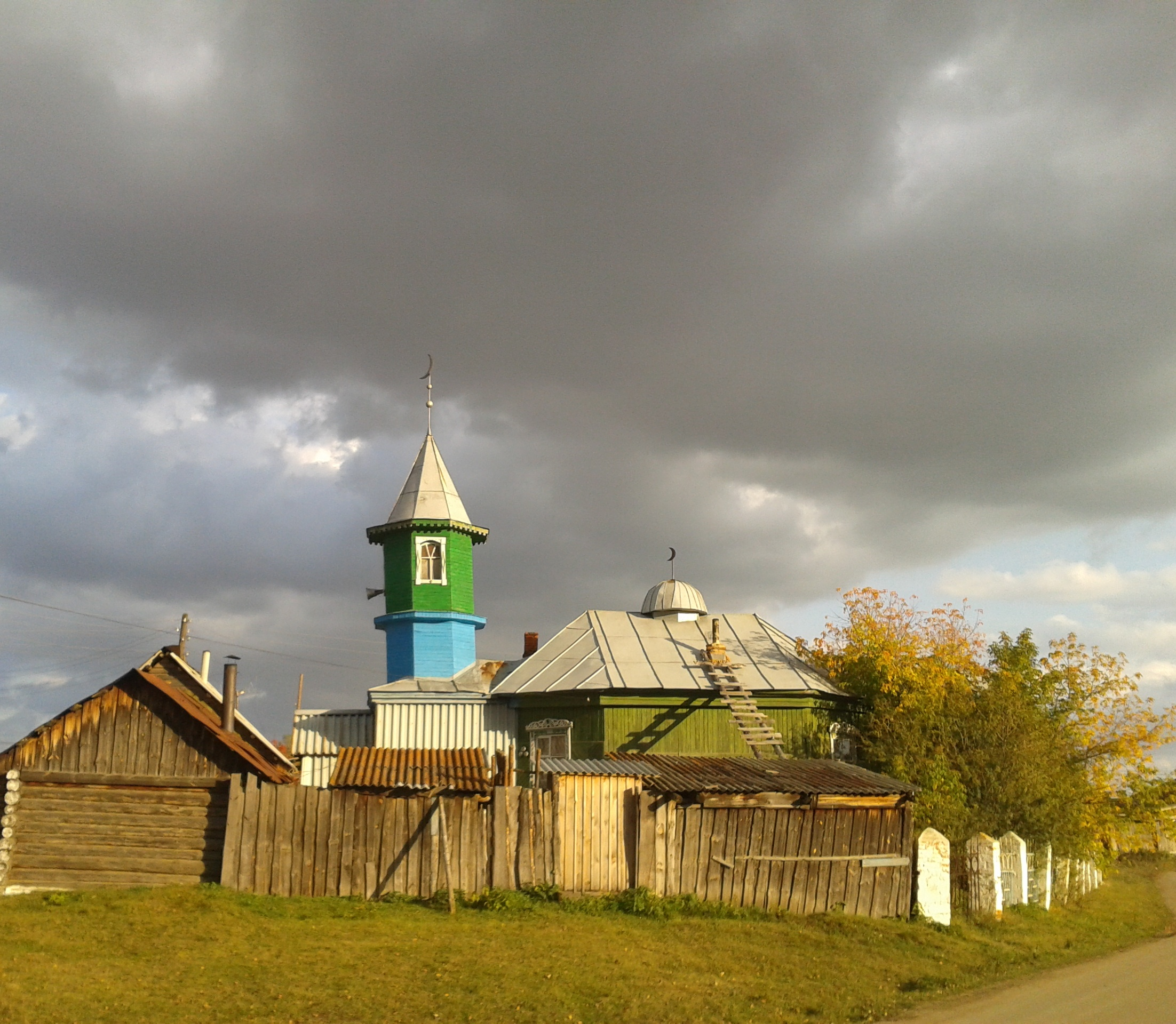
Mosque in Kuluyevo, along the Miass River, in Chelyabinsk.

=== Judaism ===
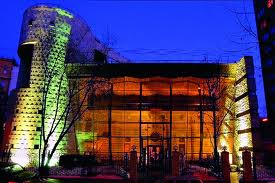
Bolshaya Bronnaya Synagogue in Moscow.

In 2012 there were 140,000 religious Jews in Russia, while the number of ethnic Jews was significantly larger. Indeed, most ethnic Jews in Russia are not Jewish by religion, Judaism being the religion of just a minority of ethnic Jews; most of them are atheists and not religious, many are Christians, and a significant proportion of them are Buddhists. According to the Arena Atlas survey In 2012, only 13% of ethnic Jews believed in Judaism, 13% were Orthodox Christians, 4% simply Christians, 27% atheists, 25% believers but not affiliated with an organized religion, 4% Buddhists and 3% Pagans. Religious Jews were mostly concentrated in Kamchatka Krai (0.4%), Saint Petersburg (0.4%), Kursk Oblast (0.4%), Khabarovsk Krai (0.3%), Stavropol Krai (0.3%), Buryatia (0.2%), the Jewish Autonomous Oblast (0.2%), Kalmykia (0.2%) and Kabardino-Balkaria (0.2%).

== Eastern and Iranian religions ==
=== Buddhism ===
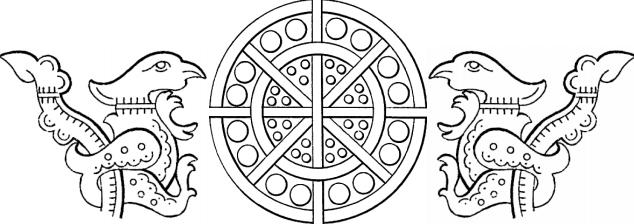
Russian dharmachakra illustrated in the essay entitled Apology of Russian Buddhism published by B. S. Grechin, the leader of an ethnic Russian Buddhist monastery in Yaroslavl, in 2016.

In 2012, Buddhism was practised by 700,000 people in Russia, or 0.5% of the total population. It is the traditional religion of some Mongolic and Turkic ethnic groups in Russia such as the Buryats, the Kalmyks, and the Tuvans, as well as a part of the Tungusic Evenks. In 2012 it was the religion of 62% of the total population of Tuva, 38% of Kalmykia and 20% of Buryatia. Buddhism also has believers accounting for 6% in Zabaykalsky Krai, primarily consisting in ethnic Buryats, having a special Agin-Buryat Okrug, and of 0.5% to 0.9% in Tomsk Oblast and Yakutia. Buddhist communities may be found in other federal subjects of Russia, between 0.1% and 0.5% inbetween 0.1% and 0.5% in Irkutsk Oblast (primarily Buryats, having a special Ust-Orda Buryat Okrug), Sakhalin Oblast, Khabarovsk Krai, Amur Oblast, Altai, Khakassia, Novosibirsk Oblast, Tomsk Oblast, Tyumen Oblast, Orenburg Oblast, Arkhangelsk Oblast, Murmansk Oblast, Moscow and Moscow Oblast, Saint Petersburg and Leningrad Oblast, and in Kaliningrad Oblast. In cities like Moscow, Saint Petersburg and Samara, often up to 1% of the population identify as Buddhists.

Buddhism in Russia is almost exclusively of the Tibetan Vajrayana schools, especially Gelug but increasingly also Nyingma and Kagyu (Diamond Way Buddhism). There are many Russian converts, and the newer schools have been often criticised by representatives of the Gelug as the result of a Russianised (Rossiysky) Buddhism and of Western Buddhist missionaries.

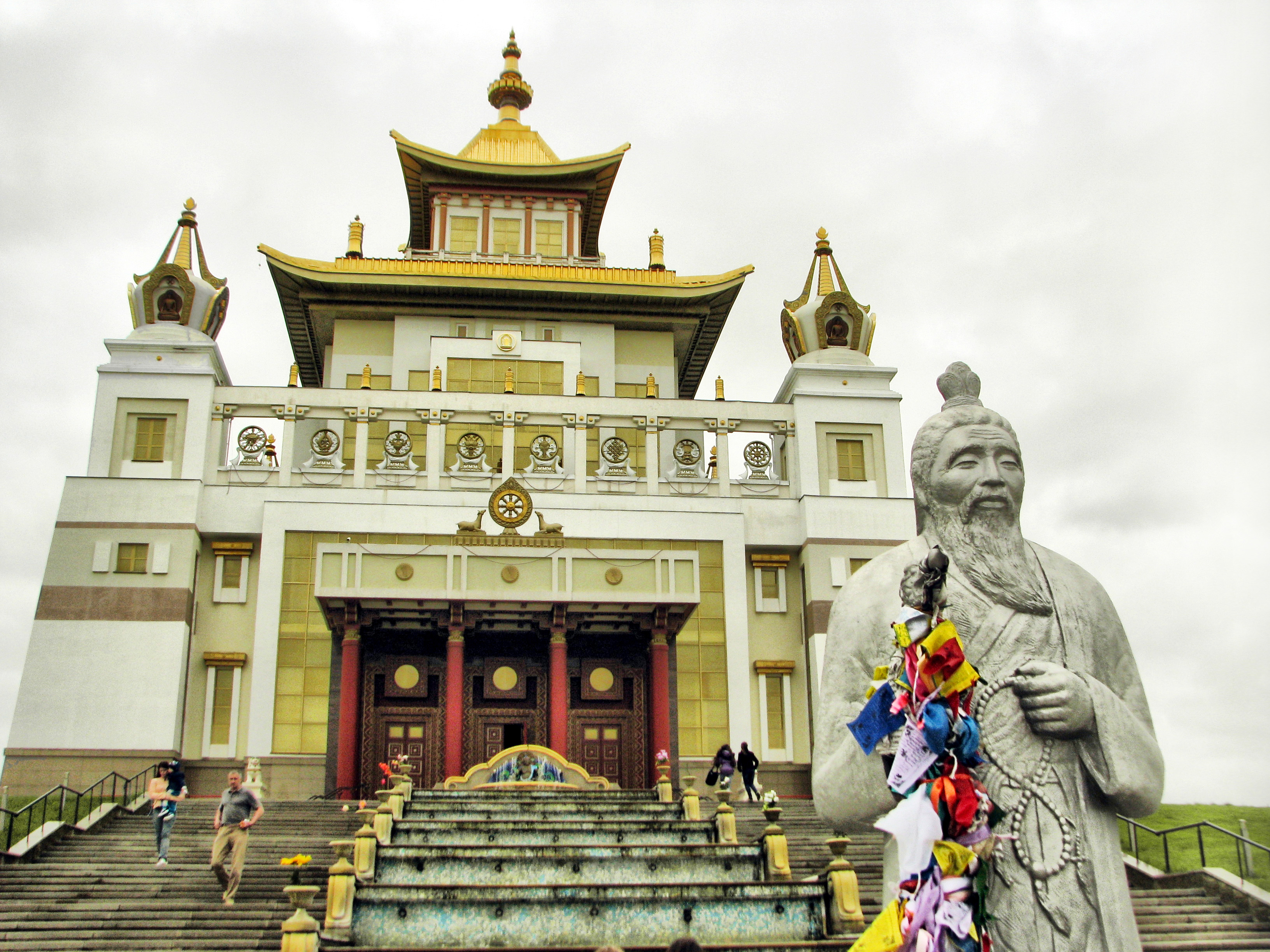
Kalmyk Burkhan Bakshin Altan Sume in Elista.

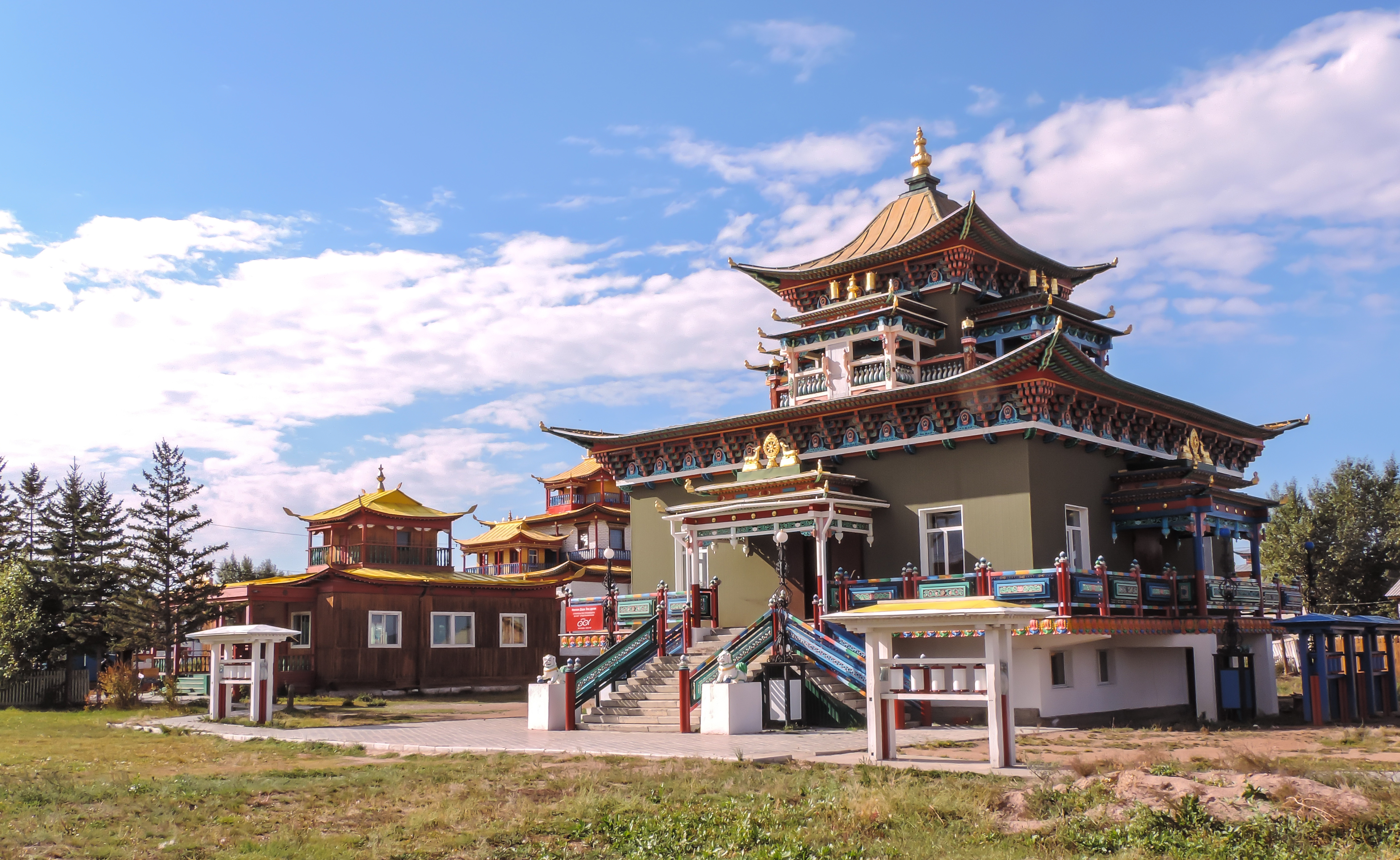
Pavilions of the Buryat Ivolginsky Datsan in Ivolginsk.

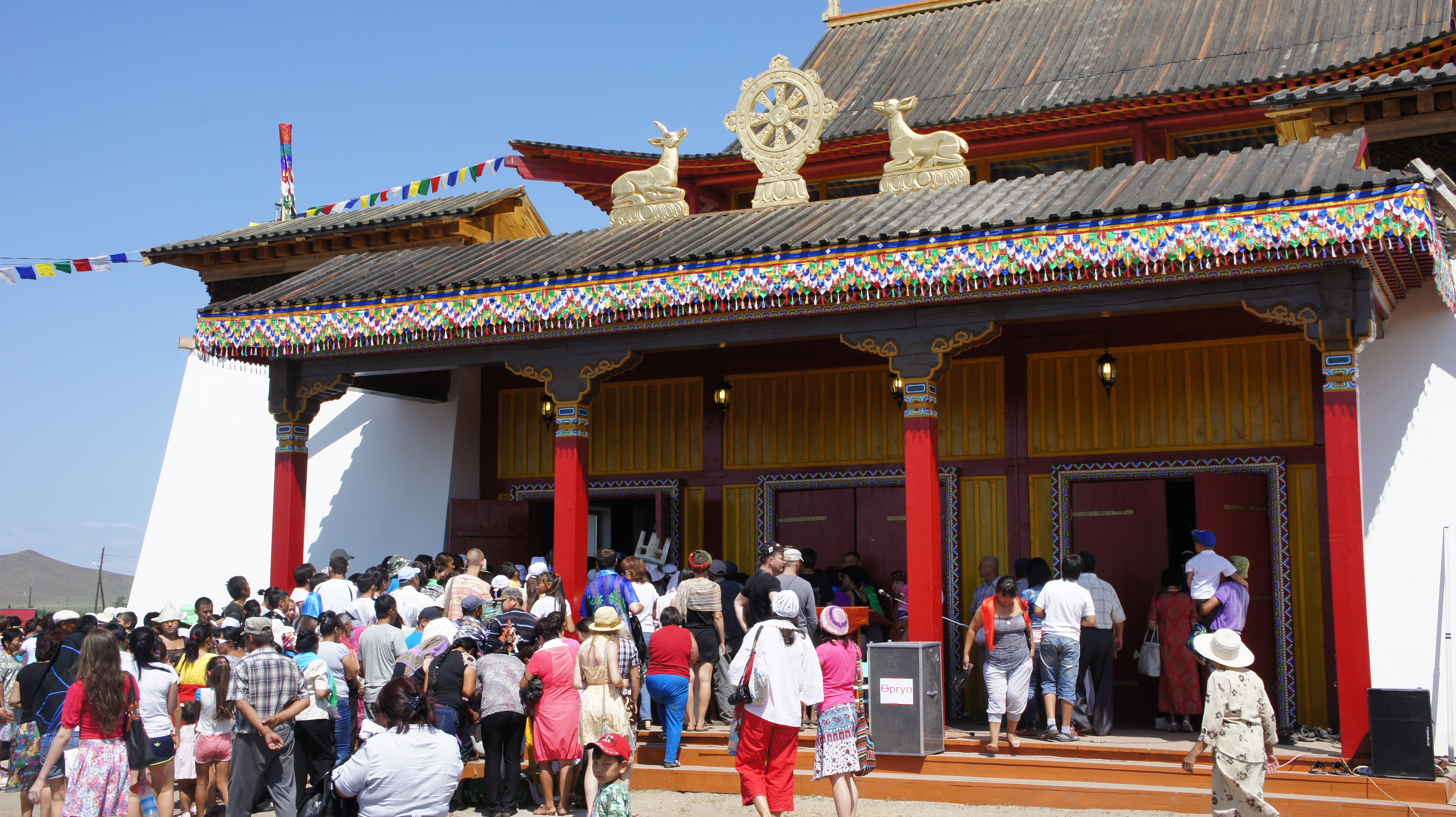
Visitors at Ustuu-Huree, a Tuvan Buddhist monastery in Chadan.

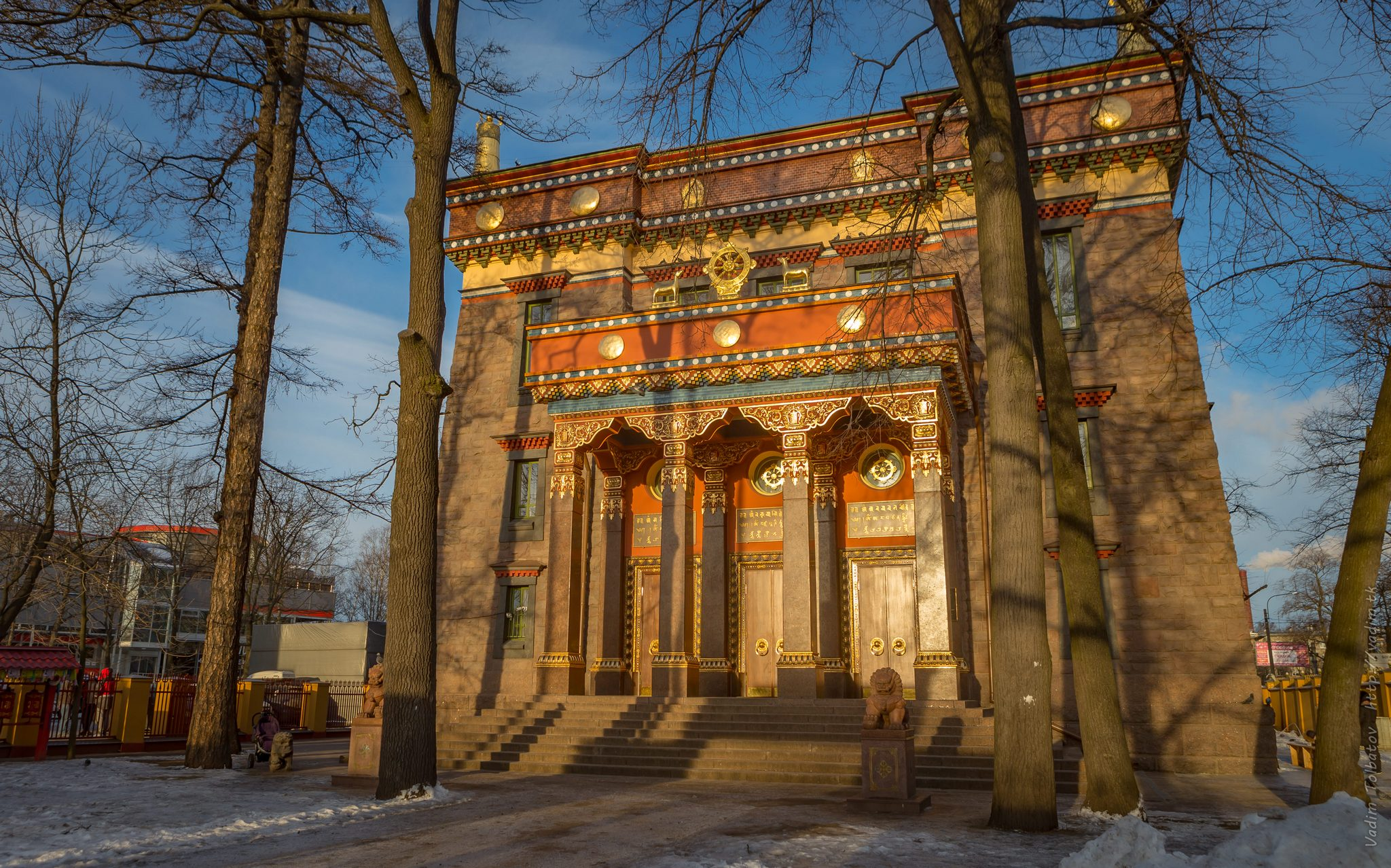
Datsan Gunzechoinei in Saint Petersburg, the northernmost Buddhist temple in Russia.

=== Hinduism ===
Hinduism, especially in the forms of Krishnaism, Vedism and Tantrism, but also in other forms, has gained a following among Russians since the end of the Soviet period, primarily through the missionary work of itinerant gurus and swamis, and organisations like the International Society for Krishna Consciousness and the Brahma Kumaris. The Tantra Sangha originated in Russia itself. The excavation of an ancient idol representing Vishnu in the Volga region in 2007 fueled the interest for Hinduism in Russia.

However, Russian Hare Krishna face the hostility of the Russian Orthodox Church. In 2011, prosecutors in Tomsk unsuccessfully tried to outlaw the Bhagavad-Gītā As It Is, the central text of the Krishnaite movement, on charge of extremism. Russian Krishnaites in Moscow have long struggled for the construction of a large Krishna temple in the capital, which would compensate premises which were assigned to them in 1989 and later confiscated for municipal construction plans; the allocation of land for the temple has been repeatedly hindered and delayed, and Archbishop Nikon of Ufa asked the secular authorities to prevent the construction "in the very heart of Orthodox Russia" of an "idolatrous heathen temple to Krishna". In August 2016, the premises of the Divya Loka monastery, a Vedic monastery founded in 2001 in Nizhny Novgorod, were dismantled by local authorities after having been declared illegal in 2015.

Hinduism in Russia was practised by 140,000 people, or 0.1% of the total population, in 2012. It constituted 2% of the population in the Altai Republic, 0.5% in Samara Oblast, 0.4% in Khakassia, Kalmykia, Bryansk Oblast, Kamchatka, Kurgan Oblast, Tyumen Oblast, Chelyabinsk Oblast, 0.3% in Sverdlovsk Oblast, 0.2% to 0.3% in Yamalia, Krasnodar Krai, Stavropol Krai, Rostov Oblast, Sakhalin Oblast, and 0.1% to 0.2% in other federal subjects.

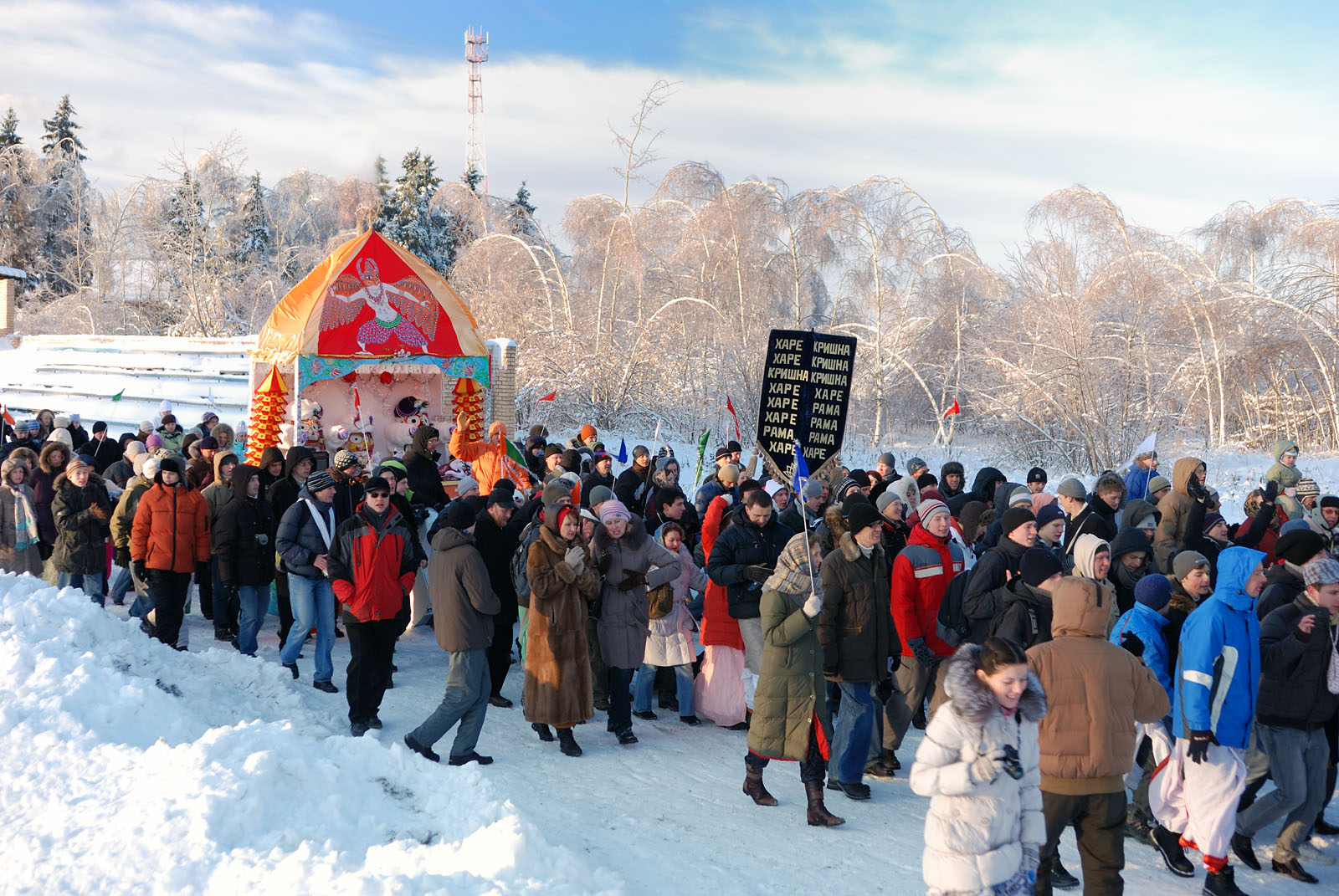
Hare Krishna in Moscow celebrating Ratha Yatra.

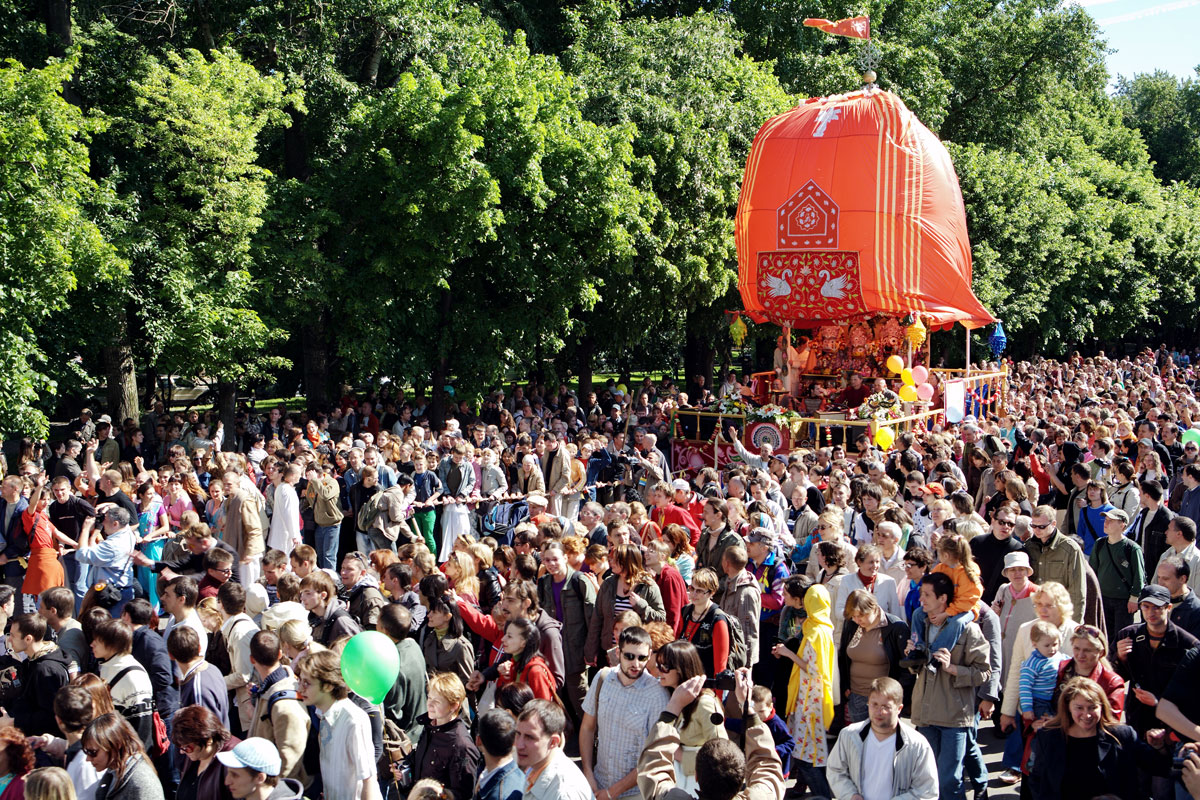
Crowds celebrating Ratha Yatra in Moscow.

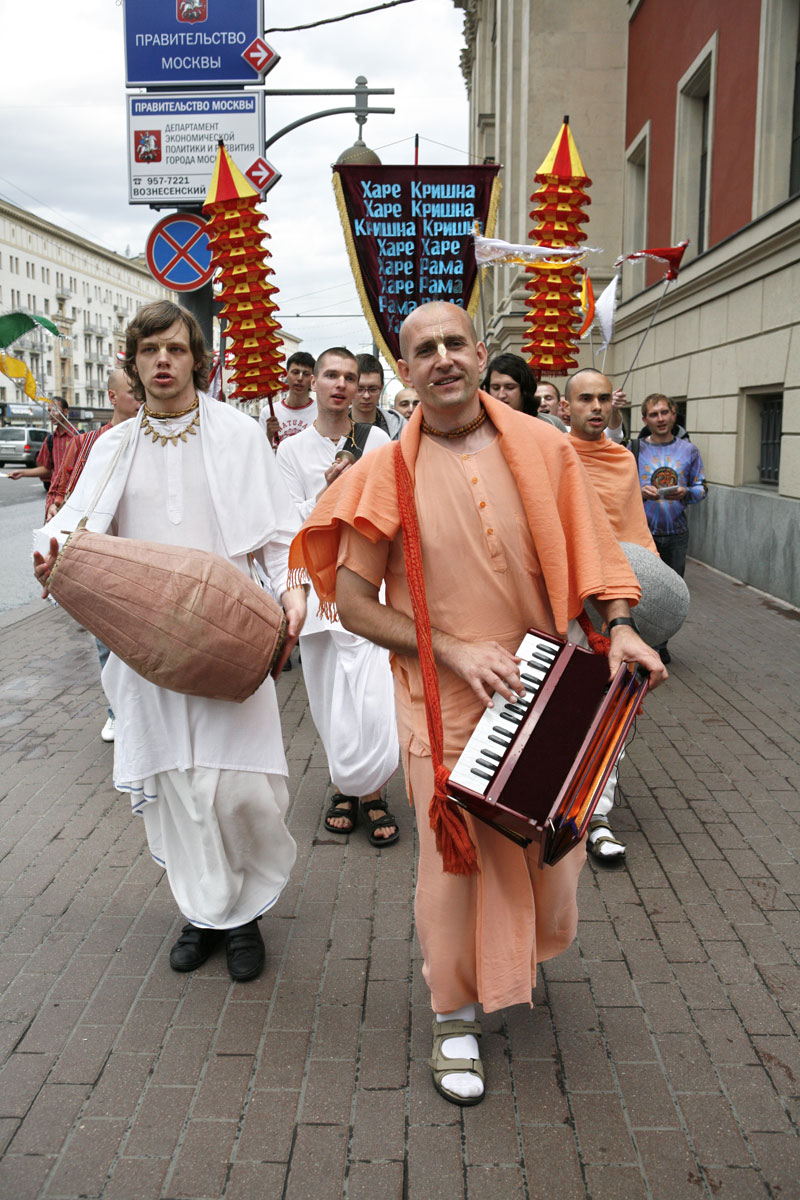
Hare Krishna devotees in the streets of Moscow.

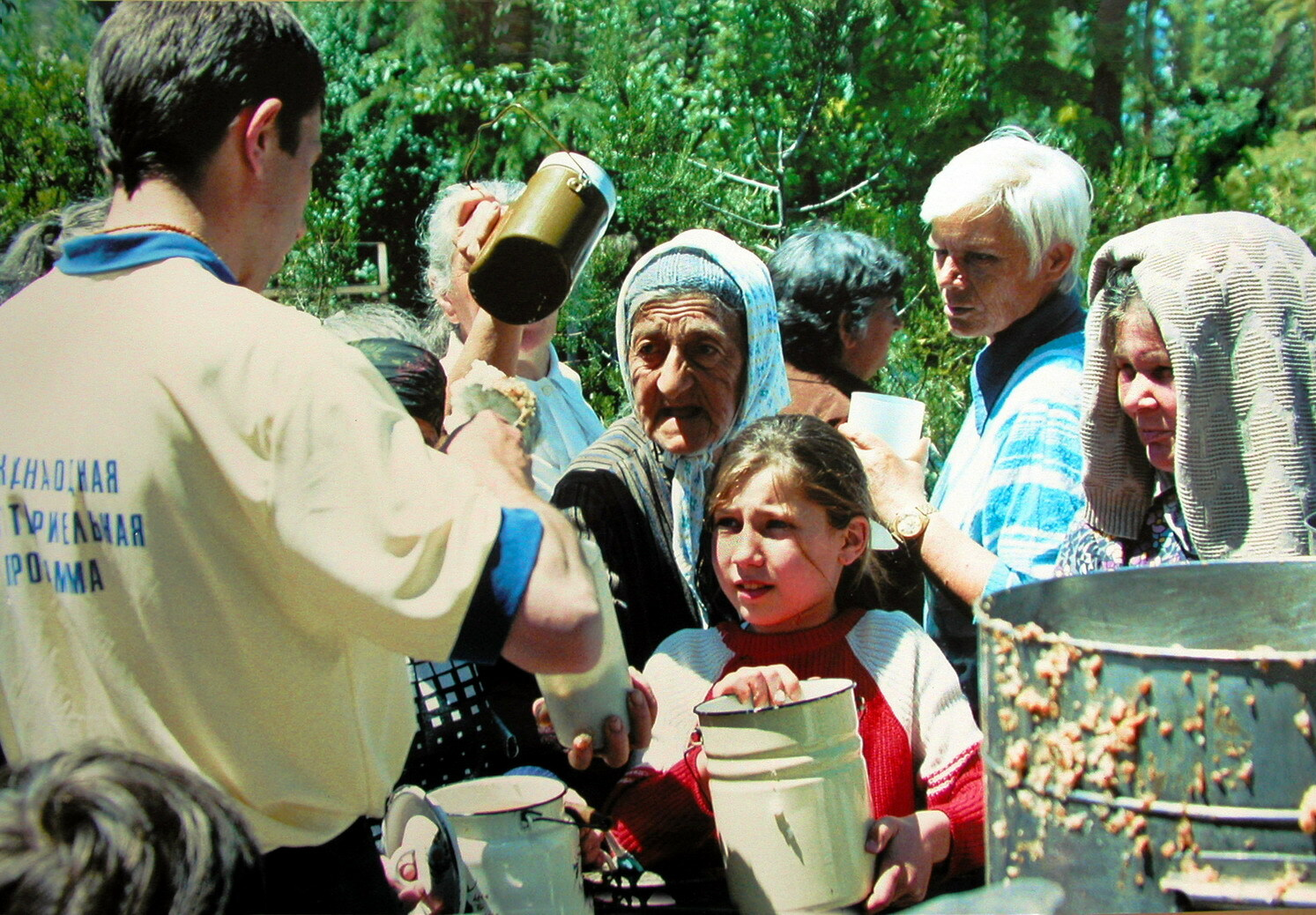
Hare Krishna devotees distributing vegetarian meals.

=== Sikhism ===
Sikhism is practised in Russia by a number of immigrants from the Indian state of Punjab and from Afghanistan, though there is a small number of Russian converts. There are two Sikh organisations in Russia: the "Gurudwara Komiti" of Moscow, catering to Afghan-Indian Sikhs, founded in the 1990s and officially registered in 2000 and "Amrit Nam Sarovar", an international orthodox Sikh missionary organisation which teaches Kundalini Yoga.

=== Taoism ===
Taoism in Russia is practised by Chinese immigrants and some Russian converts. It started to be disseminated in Russia after the end of the Soviet Union, particularly through the work of Master Alex Anatole, a Russian himself and Taoist priest, founder of the Center of Traditional Taoist Studies, which has been active in Moscow since 2002. The "Victor Xiao's Studio of Taiji" in Moscow represents Longmen Taoism. Another branch present in Russia is Wuliu Taoism, headquartered in Saint Petersburg as the "Dao De Taoist Centre" since 1993, with branches in Moscow, Rostov-on-Don and Nizhny Novgorod. The "Shen Taoist Centre", headquartered in Moscow, with branches in Novosibirsk and Krasnodar, is a branch of the international organisation "Universal Healing Tao" of Mantak Chia.

=== Yazidism ===
Yazidism is practised by a minority that established itself in Russia already during the Russo-Turkish wars and especially during the First World War, though their number has grown in the 2010s with new immigrants from Iraq fleeing anti-Yazidi persecution by Muslims. Yazidi communities are registered in Yekaterinburg, Irkutsk, Nizhny Novgorod, Samara, Tula, Ulyanovsk, Yaroslavl and Krasnodar Krai. In 2016, the Research Institute of Yazidi History and Religion was established as a branch of the Institute of Oriental Studies of the Russian Academy of Sciences.

=== Zoroastrianism ===
Zoroastrianism is practised in Russia by a number of recent Russian converts, though the religion was historically influent in the region of the Northern Caucasus, among the Scythians and later in Alania and Caucasian Albania. There are two Russian Zoroastrian organisations: the "Zoroastrian Community of Saint Petersburg" registered in 1994 and originally founded at the beginning of the 1990s by Pavel Globa as the "Avestan School of Astrology"; and the "Russian Anjoman", headquartered in Moscow with branches in several other cities, that collaborates with the "Anjoman Bozorg Bazgasht", an organisation of Iranian Zoroastrian immigrants in Europe. The Russian Anjoman calls its faith "Blagovery", and in general Zoroastrianism in Russia has close links with Rodnovery.

== Ethnic religions, paganism and Tengrism ==
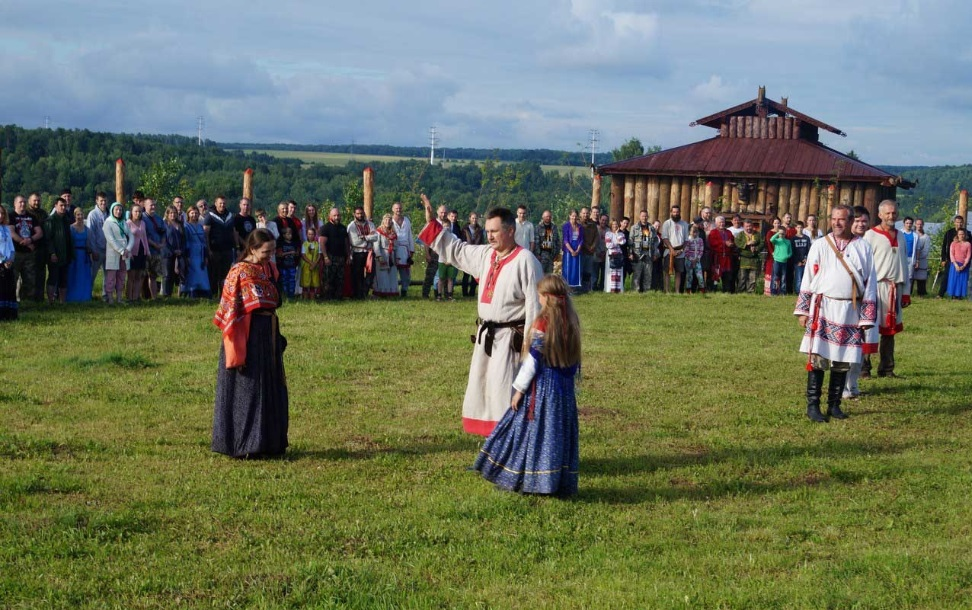
Rodnovers gathered at the Temple of Svarozhich's Fire of the Union of Slavic Native Belief Communities, in Krasotinka, Kaluga Oblast, to celebrate Perun Day.

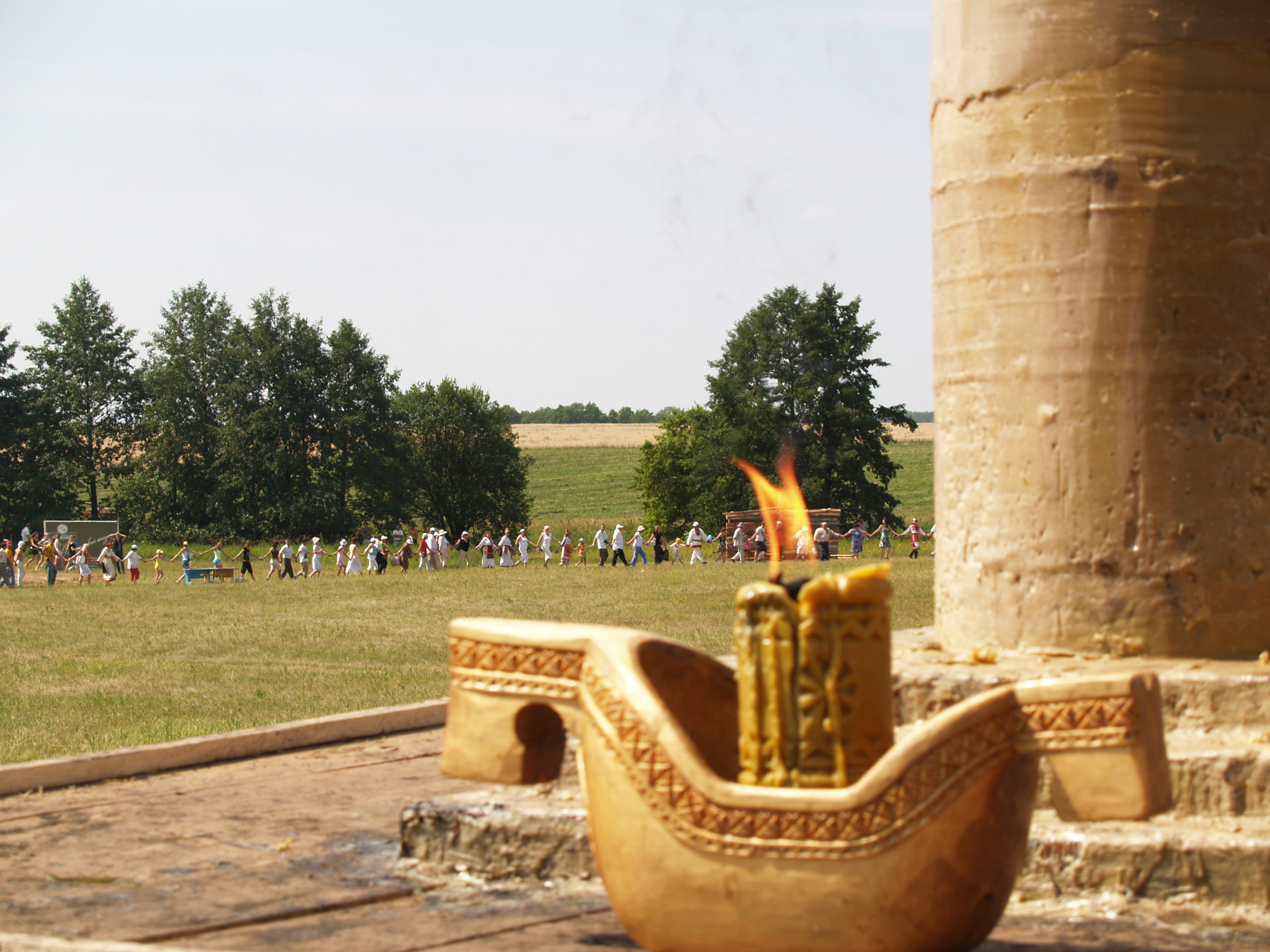
People in circle around the big candle for Rasjken Ozks, the major festival of Mordvin Native Faith.

Certain peoples of Russia, for example, the Altaians, Nganasans and Nenets, for the most part, continue to practice ethnic (indigenous) religions. Thus, according to a survey conducted in 2008 by the Research State Institute of Altaic Studies, among Altai believers, 81% were adherents of Burkhanism (Altai ethnic religion), and 5.3% of shamanism.

Paganism and Tengrism, counted together as "traditional religions of the forefathers" were the third-largest religious group after Christianity and Islam, with 1,700,000 believers or 1.2% of the total population of Russia in 2012. These religions are protected under the 1997 law, whose commentary specifies that "other religions and creeds which constitute an inseparable part of the historical heritage of Russia's peoples" also applies to "ancient Pagan cults, which have been preserved or are being revived". Tengrism is a term which encompasses the traditional ethnic and shamanic religions of the Turkic and Mongolic peoples, and modern movements reviving them in Russia. Paganism in Russia is primarily represented by the revival of the ethnic religions of the Russian Slavic people and communities, the Ossetians (Scythian), but also by those of Caucasian and Finno-Ugric ethnic minorities.

In 2012, Slavic Native Faith (Rodnovery), Caucasian Neopaganism, and Ossetian Assianism were represented by significant numbers of believers in North Ossetia–Alania (29%), Karachay-Cherkessia (12%), Kabardino-Balkaria (3%), Orenburg Oblast (over 3%), Kemerovo Oblast (over 3%), 2% to 3% in Dagestan, Astrakhan Oblast, Kaluga Oblast, Tyumen Oblast, Irkutsk Oblast and Magadan Oblast. The Slavic Native Faith was also present in many of the federal subjects of Western Russia in percentages ranging between 1% and 2%.

Rodnovery alone represented 44% of the followers of the "traditional religions of the forefathers", thus approximately 750,000 people. Rodnover organisations include the Union of Slavic Rodnover (Native Faith) Communities headquartered in Kaluga. The Moscow Community was the first to be registered by the state in 1994. Russian Rodnovers believe in Rod, the supreme God, and in lesser deities who include Perun and Dazhbog. Russian centers of Rodnovery are situated also in Dolgoprudny, Pskov and other cities, and Moscow has several shrines.

Uralic Neopaganism is practised by the Finnic ethnic minorities (primarily the Mari, the Mordvins, the Udmurts and the Komi). Among these peoples, paganism survived as an unbroken tradition throughout the Soviet period. The Mari Native Faith was practised by 6% of the population of Mari El in 2012. Other studies reported a higher proportion of 15%. Paganism was practised by between 2% and 3% of the population of Udmurtia (Udmurt Vos) and Perm Krai, and by between 1% and 2% of the population of the Komi Republic.

There are Rodnover groups that mix Finnic and Slavic elements, while other Rodnover organisations also cater to people who follow Scandinavian (Heathen) and Greek (Hellenic) traditions.

Paganism is supported by the governments of some federal subjects, for instance Mari El. Although paganism often faces the hostility of the Orthodox clergy, Patriarch Alexy II stressed that Protestant missionaries pose a greater danger than ethnic religions, and the latter should be respected. Pagans have faced violence in some Islamic regions of the Caucasus. For instance, Aslan Tsipinov was murdered by Islamists in 2010, in Kabardino-Balkaria. Months before his death, Tsipinov was intimated by the extremists to stop his work of popularisation of Circassian (Kabardian) Pagan rituals.

Tengrism and Turco-Mongol shamanic religions are found primarily in Siberia and the Russian Far East. In 2012, 13% of the inhabitants of the Altai Republic believed in indigenous religions—which include Burkhanism or "White Faith"—, like 13% in Yakutia, 8% in Tuva, 3% in Kalmykia, between 2% and 3% in Khakassia, Buryatia and Kamchatka. The Arena Atlas did not count the population of Chukotka, where much of the Chukchi practise their indigenous religion.

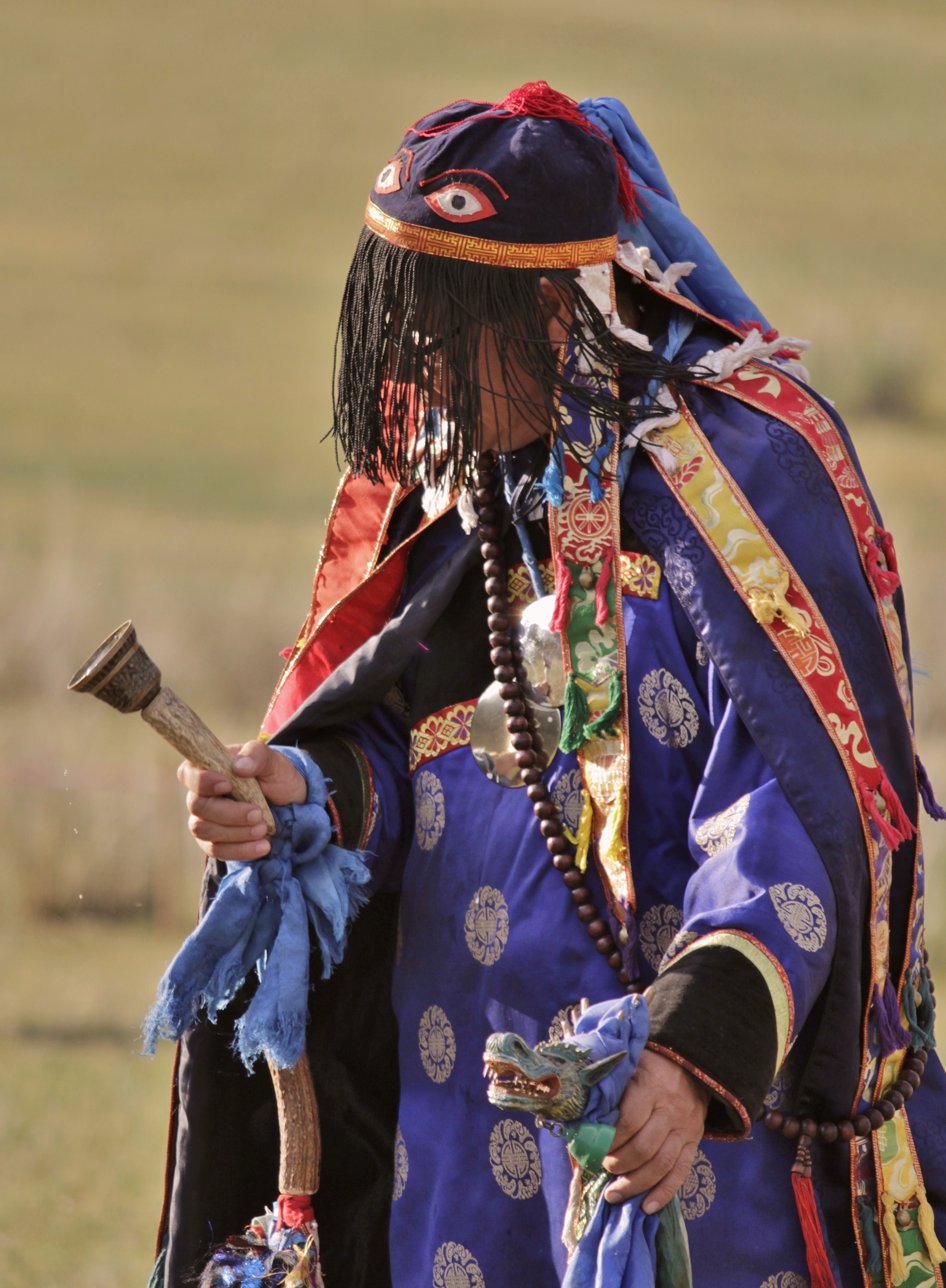
Buryat shaman Budazhap Shiretorov, head of the Altan Serge religious community.

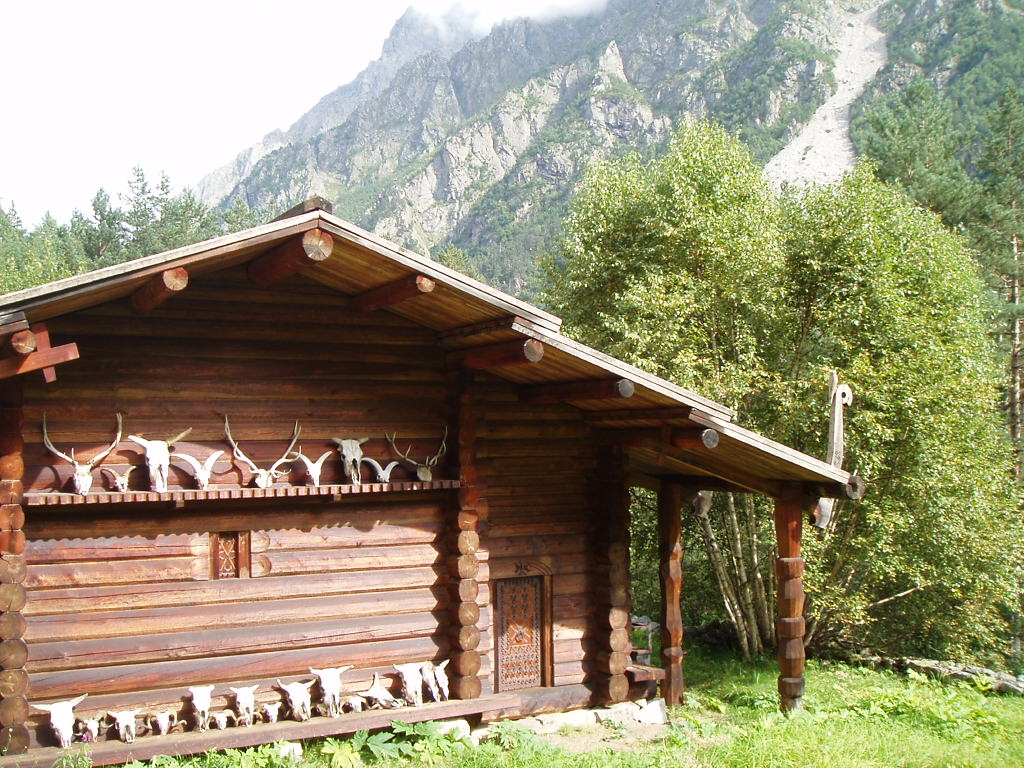
Ossetian Rekom Temple in the Tsey area, Alaginsky.

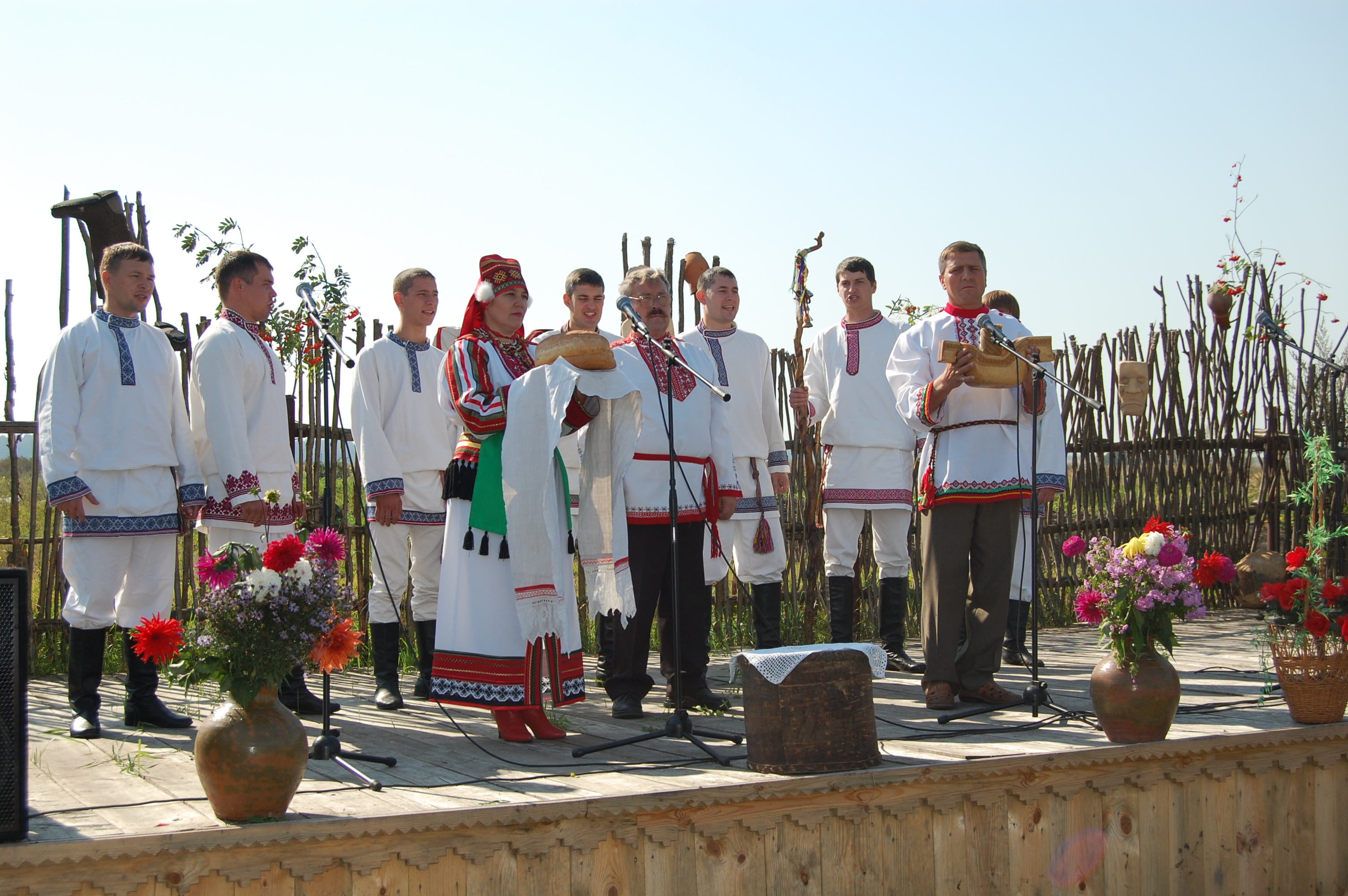
Mordvin ritual performance.

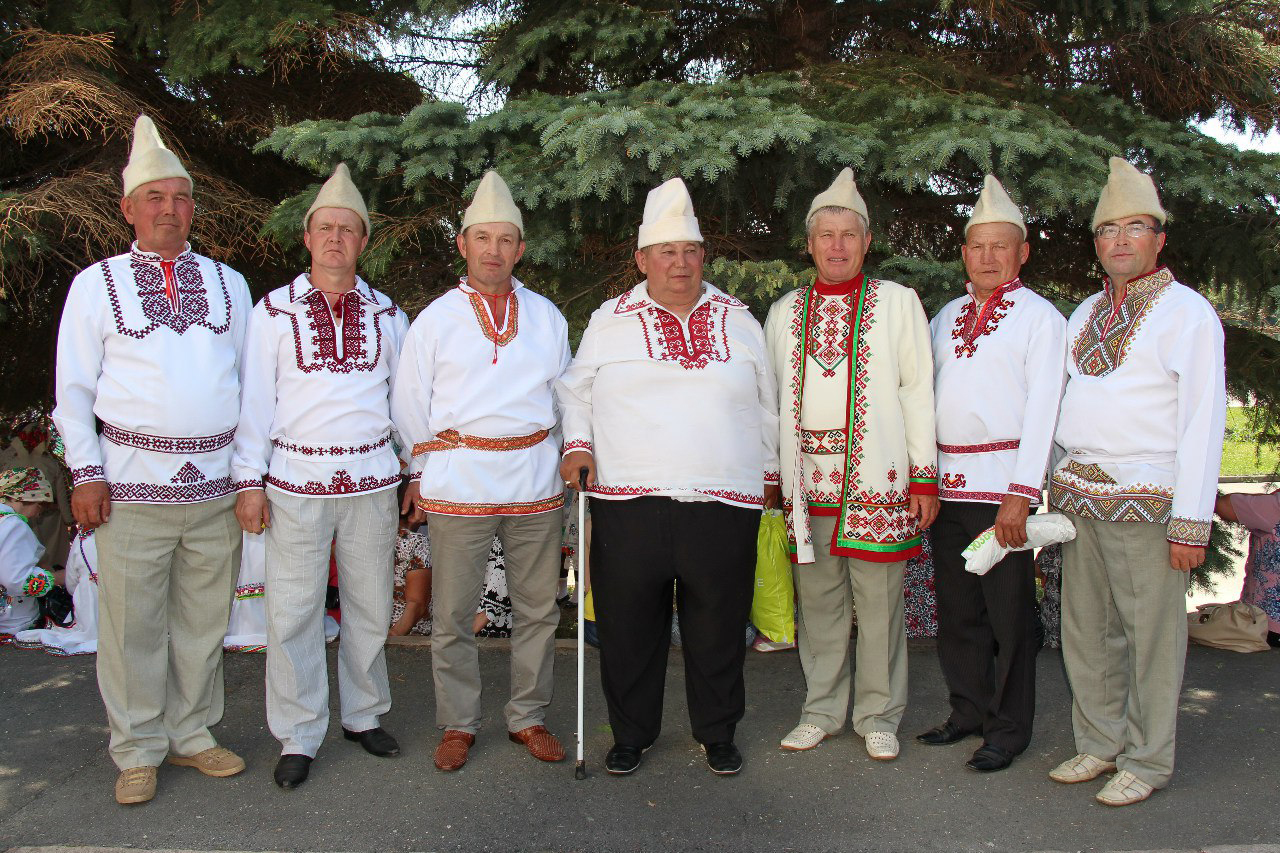
College of Mari priests (kart).

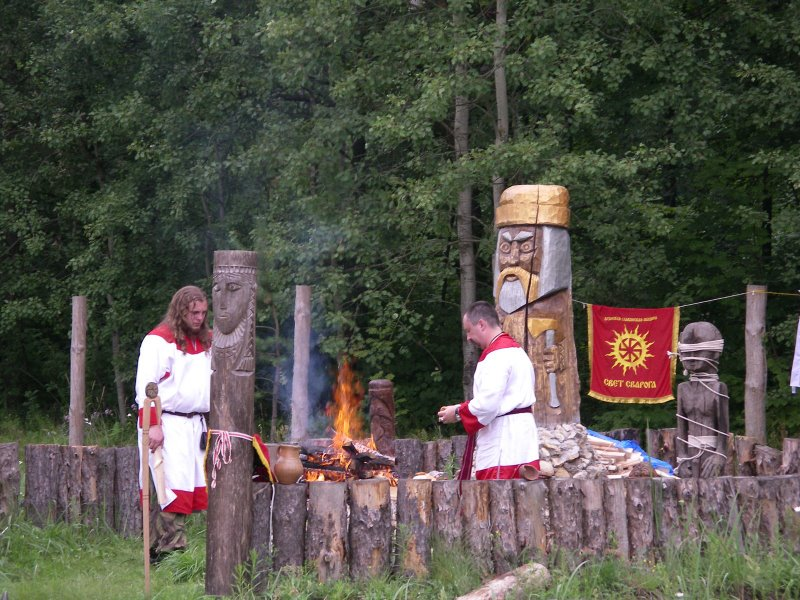
Russian Rodnover shrine in Kaluga.

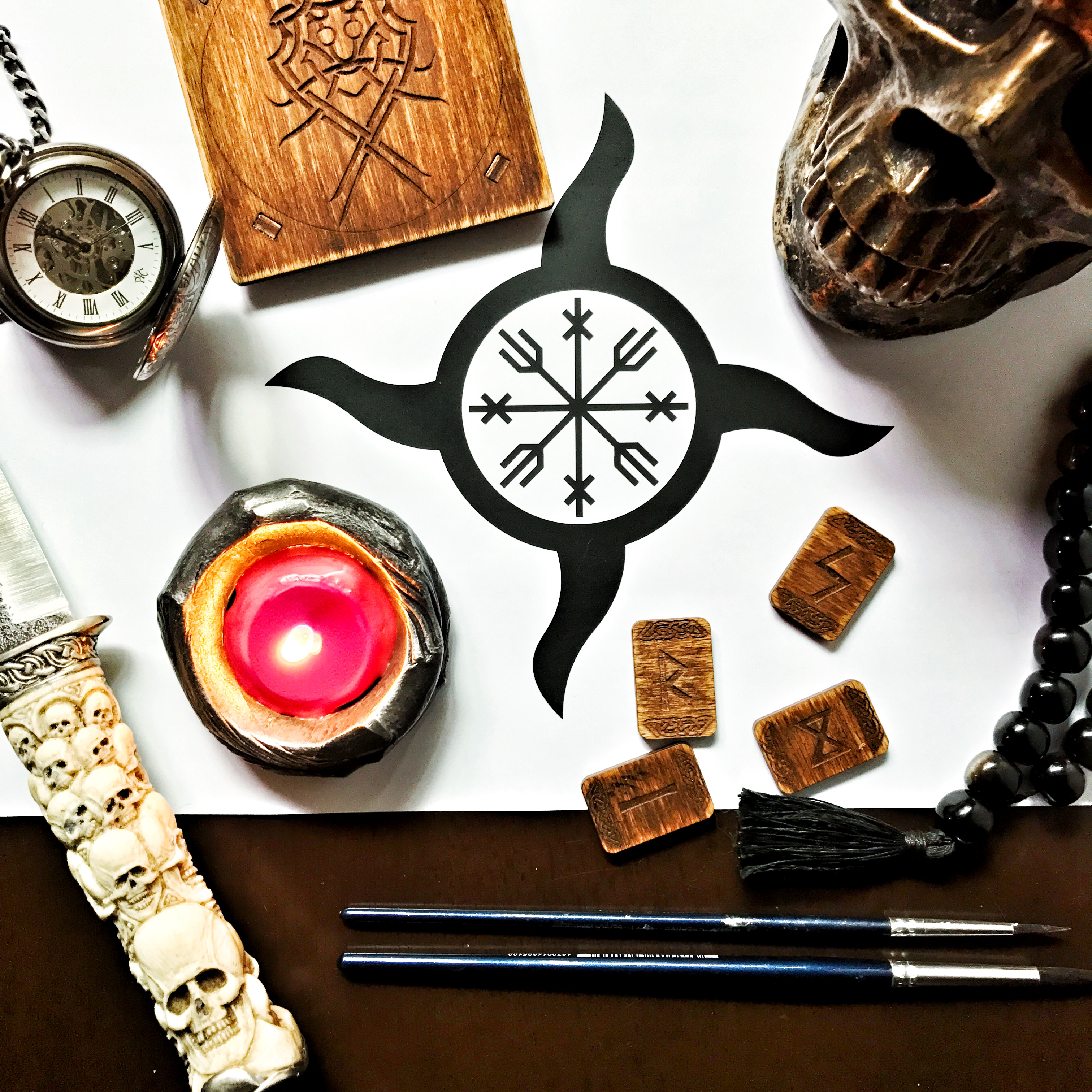
An altar for Rökkatru Heathenry of a Russian Heathen practitioner.

== New religious and spiritual movements ==
In modern Russia, "all kinds of occult, Pagan and pseudo-Christian faiths are widespread". Some of them are "disciplined organisations with a well-defined membership". The scholars of religion Sergei Filatov and Roman Lunkin, estimated in the mid-2000s that well-organised new religious movements had about 300,000 members. Nevertheless, well-organised movements constitute only "a drop in the 'new religious' ocean". Most of them are indeed "amorphous, eclectic and fluid", difficult to measure, concerned with health, healing, and lifestyle, made up of fragments borrowed from Eastern religions like Buddhism, Hinduism and yoga. According to Filatov and Lunkin, these movements, albeit mostly unorganised, represent a "self-contained system" rather than a "transitional stage on the way to some other religion".

Native new religious movements of Russia are Bazhovism, Ivanovism, Roerichism, Ringing Cedars' Anastasianism, and others. The Fourth Way, the Theosophical Society, the Anthroposophical Society, and the Radha Soami Satsang Beas are also represented. Roerichism, which was started before the perestroika, is a paradigmatic example of a movement which adapts Eastern religious beliefs to the conditions of contemporary Russia. It is not a centrally structured movement, but takes the form of a dust of clubs and associations. Another movement, Ivanovism, is a system of healing through cold and relationship between humanity and nature founded by the mystic Porfiry Ivanov (1898–1983), called "messenger of the Cosmos" by his followers. His disciples, the Ivanovites, are recognisable by their lightweight clothing and sandals worn in winter. Ringing Cedars' Anastasianism is a new religious, spiritual, and social movement close to Rodnovery that began in 1997 in Central Russia, based on the series of ten books entitled The Ringing Cedars of Russia written by Vladimir Megre. Other movements rely upon astrology, which is believed by about 60% of Russians, emphasising the imminent start of the Age of Aquarius, the end of the world as it is currently known, and the formation of a superior "Aquarian race".

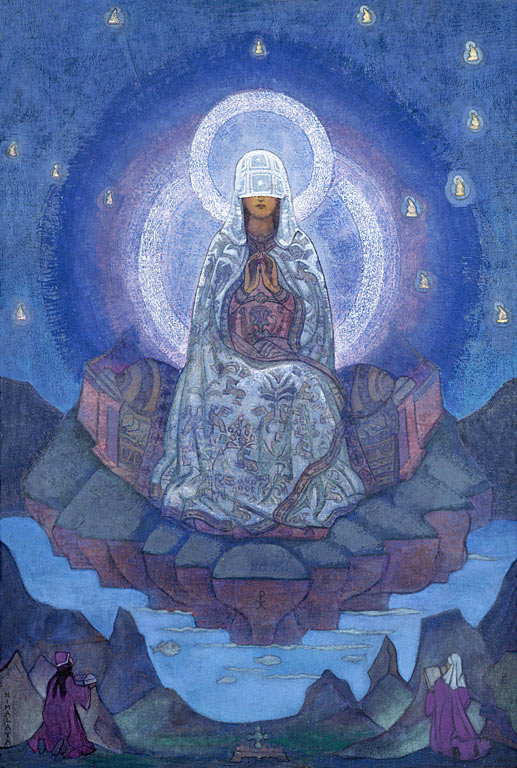
Mother of the World (1924), Nicholas Roerich.

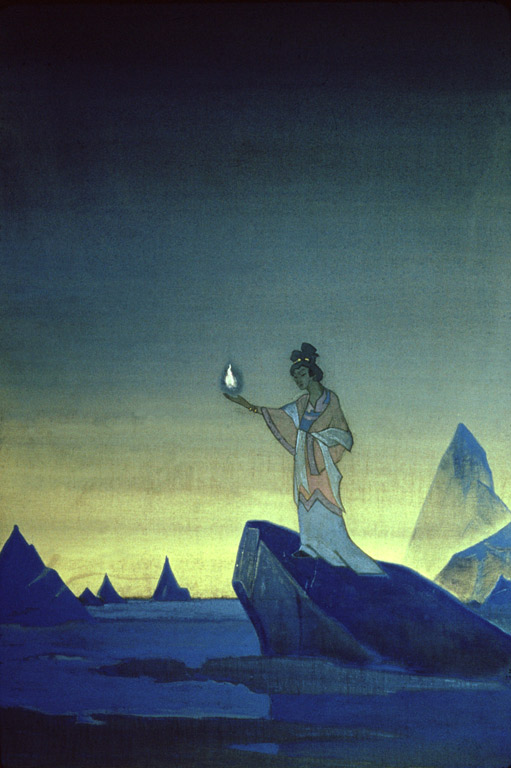
Agni Yoga (1928–1930), Nicholas Roerich.

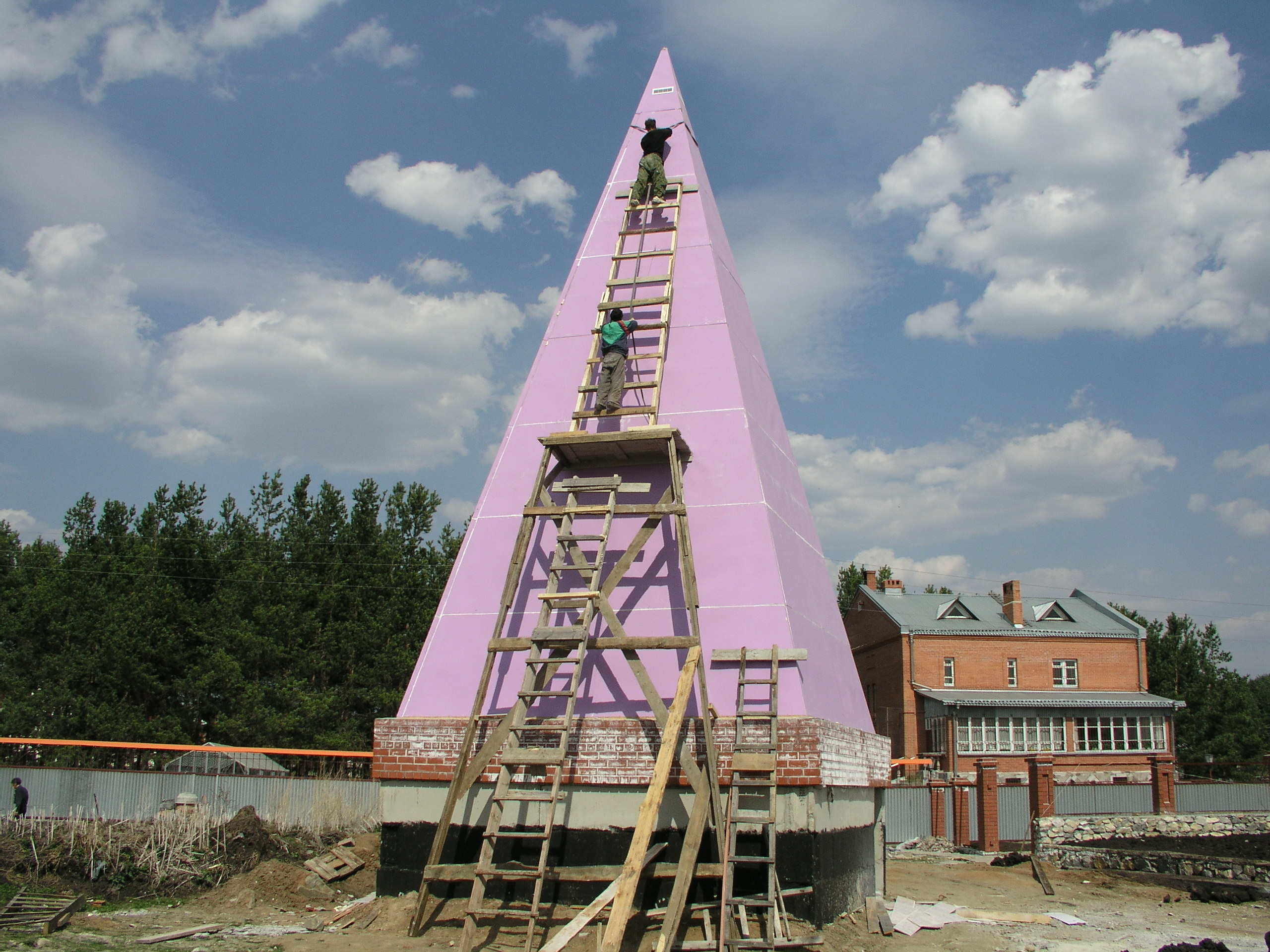
Golod pyramid under construction in Bolshoye Sidelnikovo, Sverdlovsk Oblast.

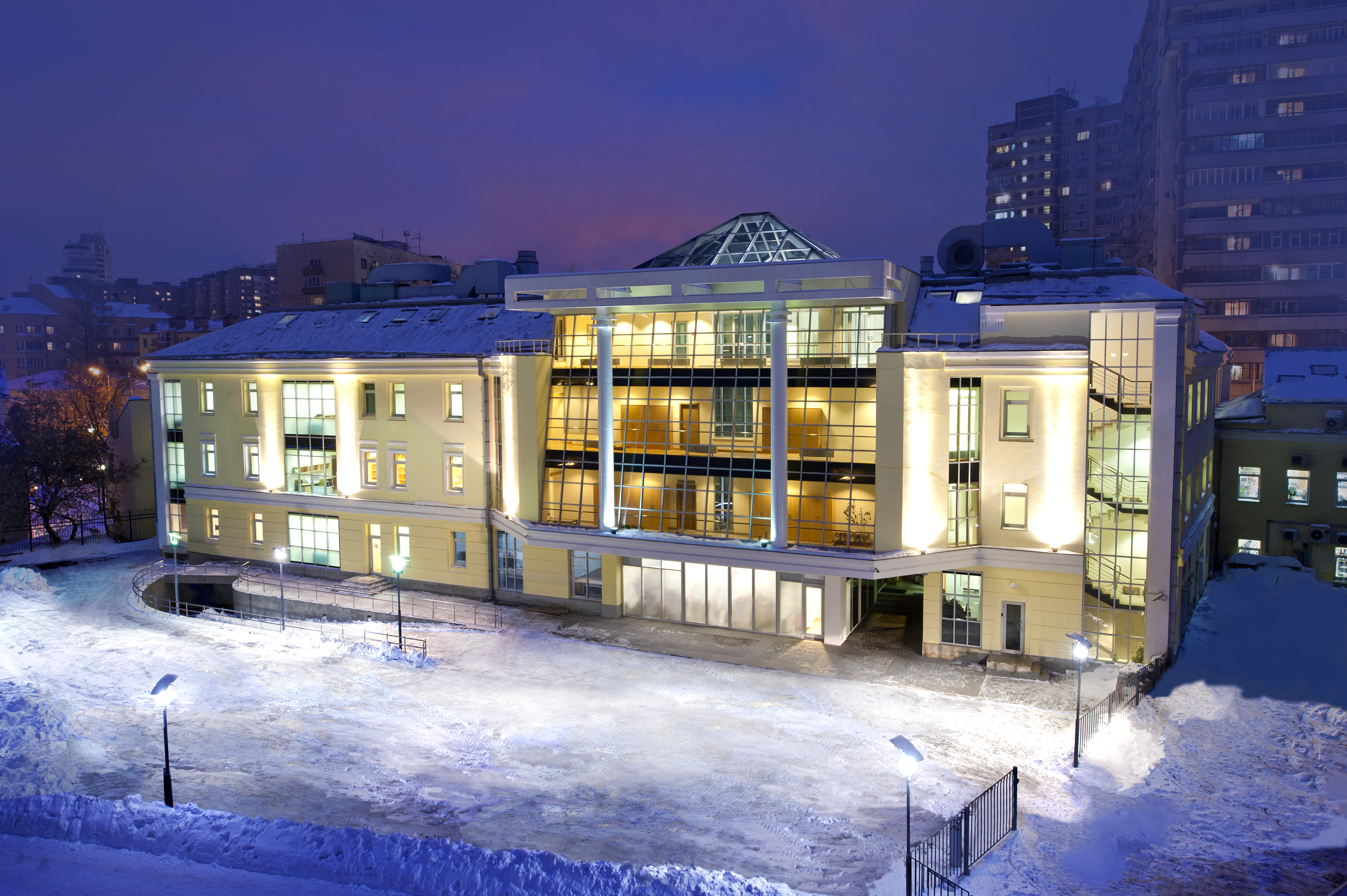
Church of Scientology in Moscow.

== Freedom of religion ==
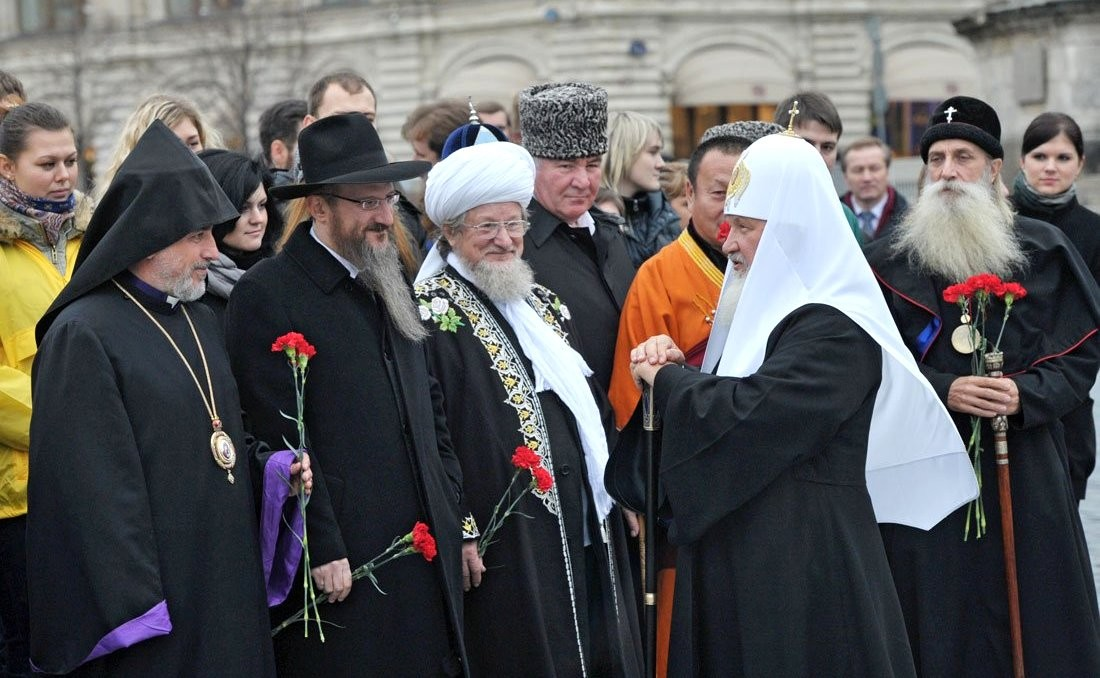
Russian religious leaders (Armenian, Jewish, Muslim, Buddhist, Orthodox, Old Believer) during the official celebrations of the National Unity Day, 4 November 2012

According to some Western commentators, respect for freedom of religion by secular authorities has declined in Russia since the late 1990s and early 2000s. In addition, the government continues to grant privileges to the Russia Orthodox Church not accorded to any other church or religious association. In 2006, a Mari Pagan priest, Vitaly Tanakov, was successfully convicted of extremism and sentenced to 120 hours of compulsory labour for having published a politico-religious tract, A Priest Speaks (Onajeng Ojla), which in 2009 was added to the federal list of material deemed "extremist".

In 2011 there was an unsuccessful attempt to ban the Bhagavad-Gītā As It Is on the same charge. In August 2016, the premises of a Vedic monastery founded in 2001 in Nizhny Novgorod were demolished by local authorities after having been declared illegal in 2015. It has been observed that the categories of "extremist" and "totalitarian sect" have been consistently used to try to outlaw religious groups which the Russian Orthodox Church classifies as "not traditional", including the newest Protestant churches and Jehovah's Witnesses. There is a ban of Jehovah's Witnesses activities in Russia.

In 2017, a report from the U.S. Commission on International Religious Freedom stated that: "The Russian government views independent religious activity as a major threat to social and political stability, an approach inherited from the Soviet period". Thus, for the first time, the USCIRF classified Russia as one of the world's worst violators of freedom of religion, a "country of particular concern" under the International Religious Freedom Act. The report also affirmed that Russia "is the sole state to have not only continually intensified its repression of religious freedom ..., but also to have expanded its repressive policies. ...Those policies, ranging from administrative harassment to arbitrary imprisonment to extrajudicial killing, are implemented in a fashion that is systematic, ongoing, and egregious". Many other countries and international organizations have spoken out on Russia's religious abuses.

=== Bhagavad Gita trial ===
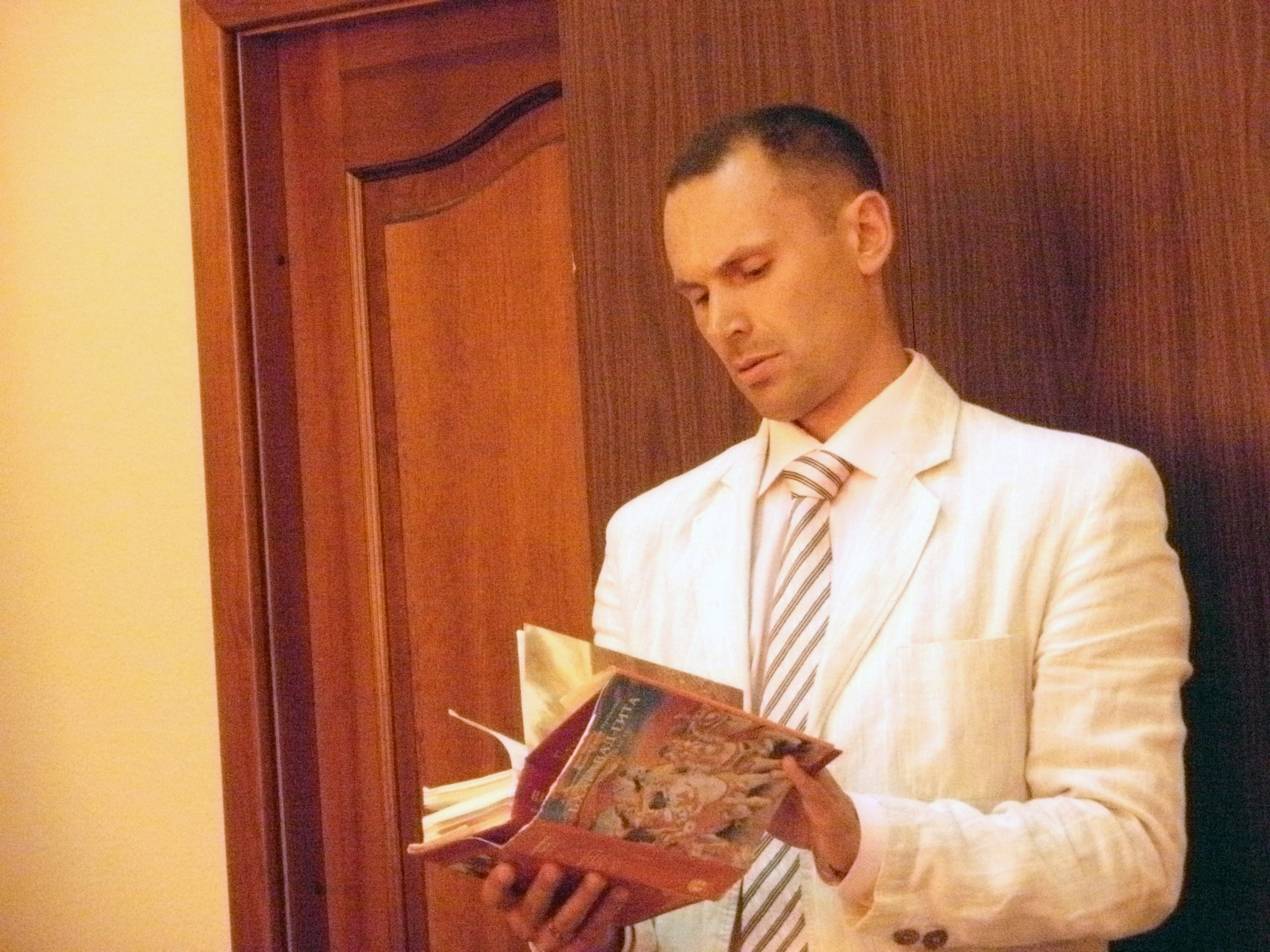
Alexander Shakov, the representative of the defense for the Bhagavad-Gītā As It Is, holding a copy of the book at the first court hearing in 2011.

In 2011, a group linked to the Russian Orthodox Church demanded a ban of the Bhagavad-Gītā As It Is, the book of the International Society for Krishna Consciousness, in Tomsk Oblast, on charge of extremism. The case was eventually dismissed by the federal judge on 28 December 2011.

The Russian ambassador Alexander Kadakin condemned the "madmen" who sought the ban, and underlined that Russia is a secular country. To protest the attempted ban, 15,000 Indians in Moscow, and followers of the International Society for Krishna Consciousness throughout Russia, appealed to the government of India asking an intervention to resolve the issue. The move triggered strong protests by members of the Parliament of India who wanted the government to take a strong position. The final court hearing in Tomsk was then scheduled on 28 December, after the court agreed to seek the opinion of the Tomsk ombudsman on human rights and of Indologists from Moscow and Saint Petersburg.

== See also ==
- Anti-Semitism in Russia
- Anti-Semitism in the Soviet Union
- Bahá'í Faith in Russia
- Consecration of Russia
- Irreligion in Russia
- Persecution of Christians in the Soviet Union
- Religion and the Russian invasion of Ukraine

== Sources ==
- Aitamurto, Kaarina (2016). Paganism, Traditionalism, Nationalism (PDF). Routledge. ISBN 9781472460271. Archived from the original (PDF) on 2 April 2019.
- Balzer, Marjorie Mandelstam (2015). Religion and Politics in Russia: A Reader. Routledge. ISBN 9781317461128.
- Bennett, Brian P. (2011). Religion and Language in Post-Soviet Russia. Routledge. ISBN 9781136736131.
- Berdyaev, Nikolai (1999) [1916]. "Spiritual Christianity and Setvctarianism in Russia". Russkaya Mysl ("Russian Thought"). Translated by S. Janos. Archived from the original on 19 July 2023 – via Berdyaev.com.
- Borenstein, Eliot (1999). "Suspending Disbelief: "Cults" and Postmodernism in Post-Soviet Russia"". In Barker, Adele Marie (ed.). Consuming Russia: Popular Culture, Sex, and Society Since Gorbachev. Duke University Press. ISBN 9780822323136.
- Bourdeaux, Michael (2003). "Trends in Religious Policy". Eastern Europe, Russia and Central Asia. Taylor and Francis. pp. 46–52. ISBN 9781857431377.
- Budkina, Irina (2 May 2005). "Religious Freedom Since 1905 — Any Progress in Russia?". Occasional Papers on Religion in Eastern Europe. 26 (2). OCLC 8092013871.
- Curtis, Glenn E.; Leighton, Marian (1998). "Religion". In Curtis, Glenn E. (ed.). Russia: A Country Study. Area handbook series. Library of Congress, Federal Research Division (1st ed.). Washington, DC: U.S. Government Printing Office. pp. 202–220. ISBN 0-8444-0866-2. Archived from the original on 9 July 2021. | via Archive.org
- Devlin, Judith (1999). Slavophiles and Commissars: Enemies of Democracy in Modern Russia. Springer. ISBN 9780333983201.
- Fagan, Geraldine (2013). Believing in Russia: Religious Policy After Communism. Routledge. ISBN 9780415490023.
- Filatov, Sergei; Lunkin, Roman (2006). "Statistics on Religion in Russia: The Reality Behind the Figures" (PDF). Religion, State & Society. 34 (1). Routledge. doi:10.1080/09637490500459875. ISSN 0963-7494. S2CID 257032. Archived from the original (PDF) on 25 April 2018.
- Kharitonova, Valentina (2015). "Revived Shamanism in the Social Life of Russia". Folklore. 62. FB and Media Group of LM: 37–54. doi:10.7592/FEJF2015.62.kharitonova. ISSN 1406-0949.
- Knox, Zoe (2008). "Religious Freedom in Russia: The Putin Years". In Steinberg, Mark D.; Wanner, Catherine (eds.). Religion, Morality, and Community in Post-Soviet Societies. Indiana University Press. pp. 281–314. ISBN 9780253220387.
- Pranskevičiūtė, Rasa (2015). "The "Back to Nature" Worldview in Nature-based Spirituality Movements: The Case of the Anastasians". In James R. Lewis; Inga Bårdsen Tøllefsen (eds.). Handbook of Nordic New Religions. Brill. pp. 441–456. ISBN 9789004292468.
- Puchkov, Pavel I. (1994). "Религиозный состав населения России" [Religious composition of the population of Russia]. In Tishkov, Valery A. (ed.). Народы России: энциклопедия [Peoples of Russia: an Encyclopedia] (in Russian). Moscow: Great Russian Encyclopedia Pub. pp. 41–53. ISBN 5-85270-082-7.
- Rosenthal, Bernice Glatzer, ed. (1997). The Occult in Russian and Soviet Culture. Cornell University Press. ISBN 9780801483318.
- Stausberg, Michael; Tessmann, Anna (2013). "The appropriation of a religion: The case of Zoroastrianism in contemporary Russia" (PDF). Culture and Religion. 14 (4). Routledge: 445–462. doi:10.1080/14755610.2013.838800. S2CID 54055689. Archived from the original (PDF) on 12 July 2017.
- Shterin, Marat S. (2010). "Russia". In Melton, J. Gordon; Baumann, Martin (eds.). Religions of the world: a comprehensive encyclopedia of beliefs and practices. Vol. 6 (2nd ed.). Santa Barbara, Ca; Denver, Co; Oxford: ABC-Clio. ISBN 978-1-59884-203-6.
- Tkatcheva, Anna (1994). "Neo-Hindu Movements and Orthodox Christianity in Post-Communist Russia". India International Centre Quarterly. 21 (2/3): 151–162. JSTOR 23003642.
- Uzzell, Lawrence (2000). "Advancing Freedom of Belief in Russia". In Vanden Heuvel, William (ed.). The Future of Freedom in Russia. Templeton Foundation Press. ISBN 9781890151430.
- Znamenski, Andrei A. (2003). "Records of Siberian Spirituality in Present-Day Russia". Shamanism in Siberia. Springer. pp. 279–358. doi:10.1007/978-94-017-0277-5_4. ISBN 9789048164844.

=== Further reading ===
General works

- Bourdeaux, Michael; Filatov, Sergei B., eds. (2003–2006). Современная религиозная жизнь России. Опыт систематического описания [Contemporary religious life of Russia. Systematic description of experiences] (in Russian). Vol. 1–4. Keston Institute. Moscow: Logos.
- Curtis, Glenn E.; Leighton, Marian (1998). "Religion". In Curtis, Glenn E. (ed.). Russia: A Country Study. Area handbook series. Library of Congress, Federal Research Division (1st ed.). Washington, DC: U.S. Government Printing Office. pp. 202–220. ISBN 0-8444-0866-2. Archived from the original on 9 July 2021. | via Archive.org
- Popov, Igor (2016). Справочник всех религиозных течений и объединений в России [The Reference Book on All Religious Branches and Communities in Russia] (e-Book) (in Russian).
- Shterin, Marat S. (2010). "Russia". In Melton, J. Gordon; Baumann, Martin (eds.). Religions of the world: a comprehensive encyclopedia of beliefs and practices. Vol. 6 (2nd ed.). Santa Barbara, Ca; Denver, Co; Oxford: ABC-Clio. ISBN 978-1-59884-203-6.

Historical

- Bremer, Thomas (2013). Cross and Kremlin: A Brief History of the Orthodox Church in Russia. Translated from German by Eric W. Gritsch. Grand Rapids, Mi; Cambridge: William B. Eerdmans Pub. ISBN 978-0-8028-6962-3.
- Davis, Nathaniel (1995). A Long Walk to Church: A Contemporary History of Russian Orthodoxy. Boulder, Co; Oxford: Westview Press. ISBN 0-8133-2276-6.
- Fennell, John (1995). A History of the Russian Church to 1448. London: Longman.
- Klibanov, Aleksandr I. (1982) [1965]. History of Religious Sectarianism in Russia (1860s–1917). Translated by Ethel Dunn. Oxford; New York: Pergamon Press. ISBN 0-08-026794-7.
- Nolte, Hans-Heinrich (1969). Religiöse Toleranz in Rußland 1600–1725. Göttinger Bausteine zur Geschichtswissenschaft, 41 (in German). Göttingen; Zürich; Frankfurt am Main: Musterschmidt. ISBN 3788110414.
- Shubin, Daniel H. (2004). A History of Russian Christianity, Vol. I: From the Earliest Years through Tsar Ivan IV. New York: Algora Pub. ISBN 978-0-87586-287-3.
- Shubin, Daniel H. (2005). A History of Russian Christianity, Vol. III: The Synodal Era and the Sectarians—1725 to 1894. New York: Algora Pub. ISBN 978-0-87586-426-6.
- Znamenski, Andrei (1999). Shamanism and Christianity: Native Encounters with Russian Orthodox Missions in Siberia and Alaska, 1820–1917. London: Greenwood Press.

Contemporary

- Chapnin, Sergei (2025). "Russian Federation". In Kenneth R. Ross; Marian Gh. Simion; Todd M. Johnson (eds.). Christianity in Eastern and Southern Europe. Edinburgh Companions to Global Christianity. Edinburgh University Press. ISBN 978-1-3995-4773-4.
- Chapnin, Sergei (2026). Religious Communities Under Pressure: Documenting Religious Persecution in Russia 2022–2026. Foreword by Rowan Williams. Albion Bixby Publishing. ISBN 979-8-9501690-3-8.
- deGraffenried, Julie K.; Long, Michael; Dennen, Xenia, eds. (2025). Freedom of Conscience in (Post)Soviet Space: Legacies of Michael Bourdeaux and the Keston Archive. NIU Series in Slavic, East European, and Eurasian Studies. Preface by Rowan Williams. Cornell University Press; Northern Illinois University Press. JSTOR 10.7591/jj.24653174.7.
- Pankhurst, Jerry G.; Kilp, Alar (2013). "Religion, the Russian Nation and the State: Domestic and International Dimensions: An Introduction." Religion, State and Society, 41 (3), Keston Institute: 226–43.
- Richters, Katja (2014). The Post-Soviet Russian Orthodox Church: Politics, Culture and Greater Russia.
