= Egor Tropeano =

Italian winter swimmer

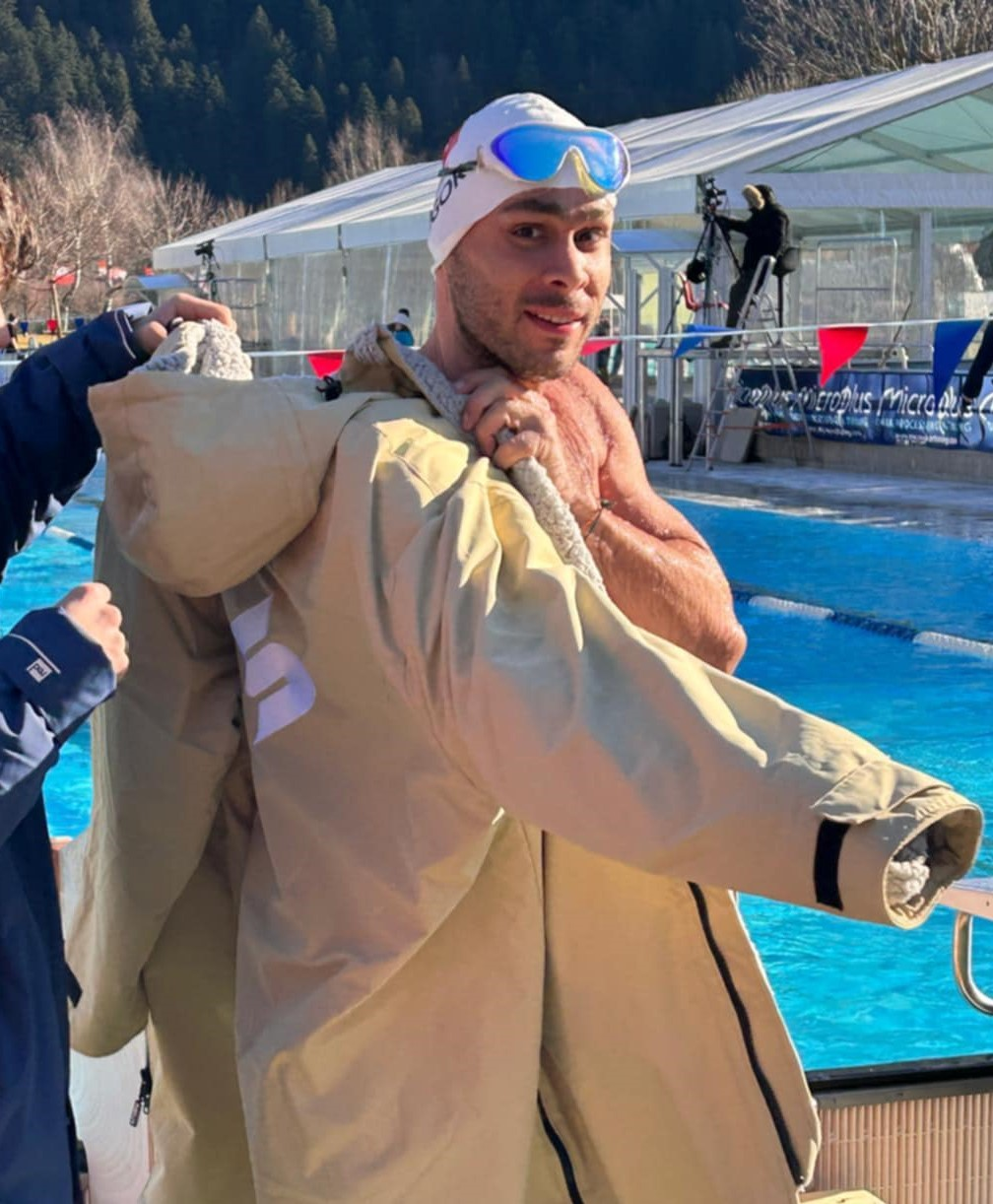
- Tropeano at the 2025 Ice Swimming World Championship

Personal information
- Nationality: Italian
- Born: 18 September 1992 (age 34) Cosenza, Italy
- Home town: Mendicino, Italy
- Occupation: Swimming coach
- Height: 183 cm (6 ft 0 in)
- Weight: 82 kg (181 lb)
- Spouse: Bengisu Avcı.

Sport
- Sport: Winter swimming, Ice swimming, Open-water swimming

Egor Tropeano (born 18 September 1992) is an Italian swimmer and swimming coach specializing primarily in winter swimming and ice swimming.

Originally from Mendicino, Tropeano became the first Italian athlete to win world championship titles in both winter swimming and ice swimming in the absolute and elite categories.

== Biography ==
Tropeano began swimming at the age of three, when his mother introduced him to the sport at the Campagnano swimming pool in Cosenza, Italy. He trained in competitive pool swimming for several years, participating in national championships and international swimming meets and setting several regional records during his early athletic career.

At the age of 19, he temporarily left competitive swimming to focus on his university studies. He later graduated with a bachelor's degree in economics from the University of Calabria and currently serves there as a remote Internationalization Tutor. After completing his degree, he moved to London, where he lived for approximately four years and worked as a swimming coach, primarily training masters swimmers and athletes preparing for channel swimming.

Tropeano began practicing winter swimming and ice swimming in late 2023, discovering the discipline at an age considered relatively advanced compared to traditional competitive pathways. His interest in cold-water swimming developed from curiosity toward endurance sports and extreme aquatic environments.

In February 2026, Tropeano set the Guinness World Record for the greatest distance breaststroke swimming in one hour (male), covering 4.245 kilometres in Antalya, Türkiye, in a 25-metre swimming pool.

Tropeano follows a vegetarian diet. Outside of swimming, he practices mixed martial arts and Brazilian jiu-jitsu and is also an endurance runner. He has completed multiple marathons, half marathons, and ultramarathons.

He currently lives and trains in Çanakkale, Turkey.

== Competition results ==
Year	Meet	Place	Sport	Event details	Result	Notes
2024	14th Winter Swimming World Championship	Tallinn	Winter Swimming	100 Breaststroke	3º	Absolute
2024	14th Winter Swimming World Championship	Tallinn	Winter Swimming	200 Breaststroke	1º	Absolute
2024	Meis Kaş Swim Race	Kaş	Open Water Swimming	7.1 km	1º	Overall
2025	6th IISA World Championship	Molveno	Ice Swimming	100 Breaststroke	1º	Elite
2025	International Antalya Open Water Swimming Event	Antalya	Open Water Swimming	1.5km	1º	Overall
2026	1º IISA Italian Championship	Lago di Cavazzo	Ice Swimming	500 Freestyle	1º	Overall
2026	Open Masters Games 2026	Abu Dhabi	Open Water Swimming	2.5 km	1º	M30-34
2026	Open Master Games 2026	Abu Dhabi	Open Water Swimming	1km	1º	M30-34
2026	15th Winter Swimming World Championship	Oulu	Winter Swimming	100 Breaststroke	1º	Absolute
2026	15th Winter Swimming World Championship	Oulu	Winter Swimming	450 Freestyle	3º	Absolute
2026	15th Winter Swimming World Championship	Oulu	Winter Swimming	200 Breaststroke	1º	Absolute
2026	15th Winter Swimming World Championship	Oulu	Winter Swimming	50 Breaststroke	1º	Superfinal
2026	Istanbul Bosphorus Aquathlon	Istanbul	Aquathlon	2.2 km swim - 3.2 kilometer run	2º	Overall
2026	Hellespont Europe to Asia Swim	Çanakkale	Open Water Swimming	6.5 km	3º	Overall
2026	"Traversata della Riviera dei Cedri" Dino - Cirella Swim	Riviera dei Cedri	Ultra Marathon Swimming	25 km solo swim	1º	First Solo Course Record (5 h 19 min)

== Records ==
Year	Event / Organization	Place	Sport	Event	Time	Notes
2024	Amsterdam Ice Swim	Amsterdam	Ice Swimming	Ice Kilometer	15:22.20	Fastest Breaststroke Ice Kilometer ever recorded
2026	IISA Italian Championship	Cavazzo Lake	Ice Swimming	Ice Mile	0:27:10	Fastest Breaststroke Ice Mile ever recorded
2026	Guinness World Record	Antalya	Swimming	Greatest distance breaststroke swimming in one hour (male)	1 Hour	4.245 kilometres, (13927.165 ft)

== Other sporting achievements ==
- Two-time winner (2025 & 2026) of the British Long Distance Swimming Association (BLDSA) 30 Minute Swim Challenge.
- Bosphorus Cross-Continental Swim finisher.
- First place in the Senior 93 kg White Belt division at the 3° MMA (Mixed Martial Arts) Italia Open.
- Second place in the 12° Italian National Brazilian Jiu-Jitsu (No-Gi Male, White Belt, -91.5 kg).
- 8th Backwaterman SwimRun 33k finisher.
