= Multisport =

Multisport may refer to:

- Multi-purpose stadium, where different sports are played
- Multi-sport clubs, which compete in several sports
- Multi-sport event, such as the Olympic Games
- Multisport race, such as a triathlon
- Multisport video game
