= Triathlon =

Swimming, cycling, and distance running race

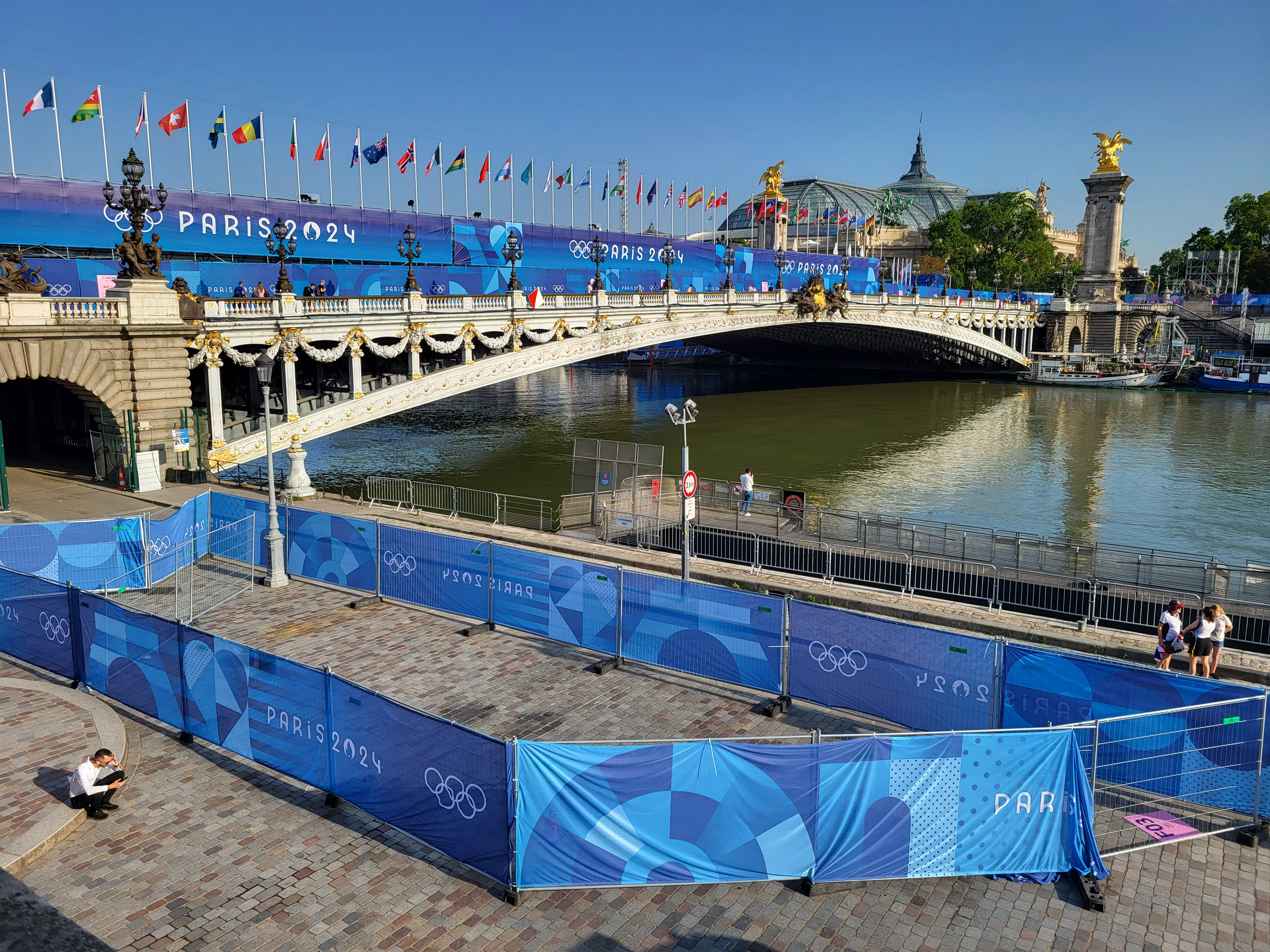
- Triathlon venue at the 2024 Summer Olympics
- Highest governing body: World Triathlon
- First played: 1920s

Characteristics
- Contact: No
- Mixed-sex: Yes, separate competitions & mixed relays
- Type: Endurance sport
- Equipment: Triathlon equipment

Presence
- Country or region: Worldwide
- Olympic: 2000 – present
- Paralympic: Paratriathlon, 2016 – present
- World Games: 1989 (invitational) – 1993

A triathlon is an endurance multisport race consisting of swimming, cycling, and running over various distances. Triathletes compete for fastest overall completion time, racing each segment sequentially with the time transitioning between the disciplines included. The word is of Greek origin, from τρεῖς (treîs), 'three', and ἆθλος (âthlos), 'competition'.

The modern version of the sport originated in the late 1970s in Southern California as sports clubs and individuals developed the sport. This history has meant that variations of the sport were created and still exist. It also led to other three-stage races using the name triathlon despite not being continuous or not consisting of swim, bike, and run elements.

Triathletes train to achieve endurance, strength, and speed. The sport requires focused persistent and periodised training for each of the three disciplines, as well as combination workouts and general strength conditioning.

== History ==
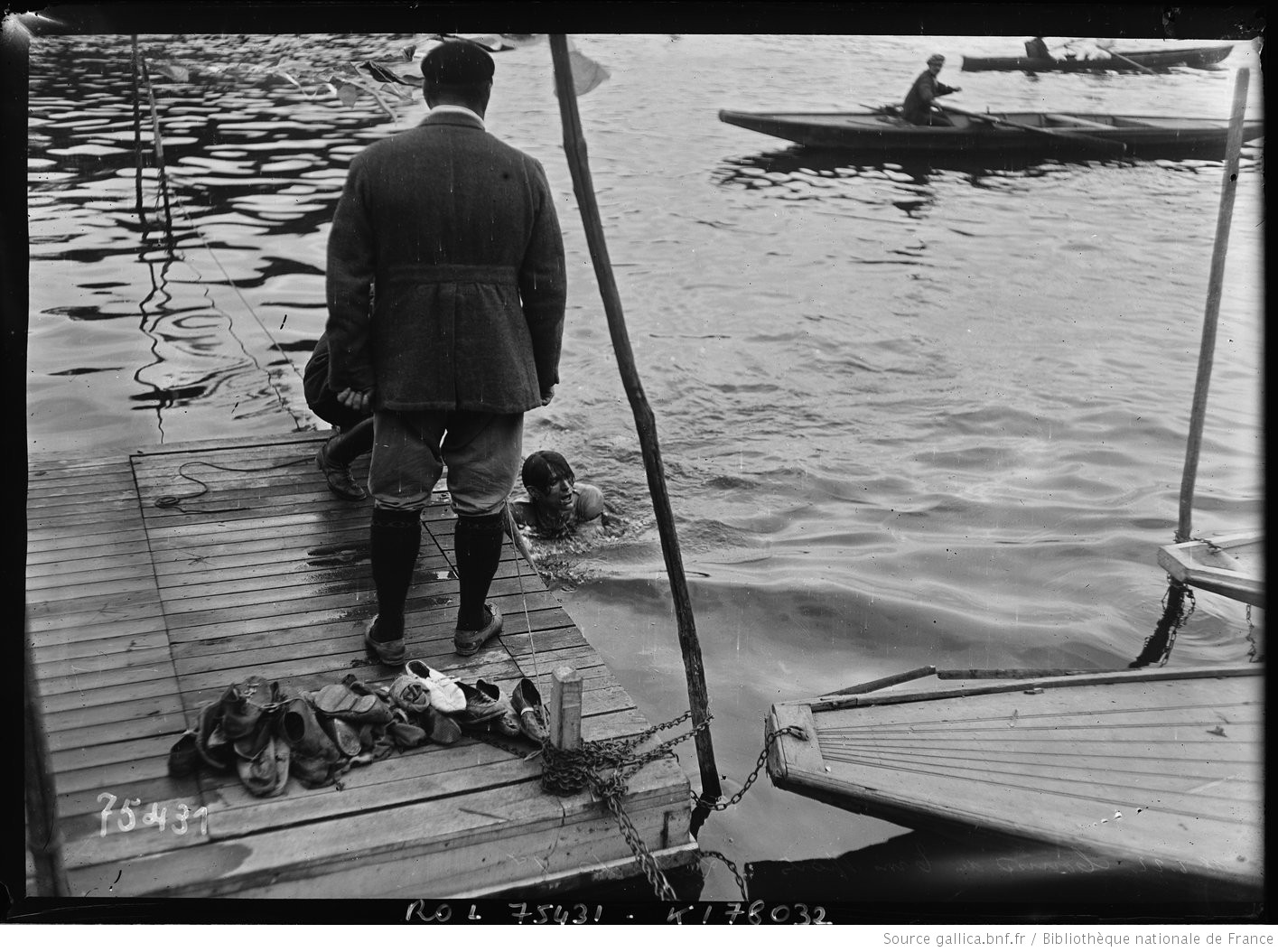
1922 Course des trois sports

The evolution of triathlon as a distinct sport is difficult to trace with precision. Many, including triathlon historian and author Scott Tinley, consider events in early 20th-century France to be the beginnings of triathlon, with many three-element multisport events of differing composition appearing, all called by different names. The earliest record for an event was from 1901 in Joinville-le-Pont, Val-de-Marne, it called itself "Les Trois Sports" (The Three Sports). It was advertised as an event for "the sportsmen of the time" and consisted of a run, a bicycle, and a canoe segment. By 19 June 1921, the event in Joinville-le-Pont had become more like a standard triathlon, with the canoe segment being replaced with a swim. According to the newspaper L'Auto, the race consisted of a 3 km (1.9 mi) run, a 12 km (7.5 mi) bike ride, and the crossing of the river Marne, all staged consecutively and without a break. Throughout the 1920s, other bike, run, and swim events appeared in different cities, such as the "Course des Trois Sports" in Marseille and "La Course des Débrouillards" in Poissy. These multisport events continued to slowly spread and grow in popularity; by 1934, Les Trois Sports was being hosted in the city of La Rochelle, though it consisted of three distinct events, swimming a 200 m (660 ft) channel crossing, a 10 km (6 mi) bike competition around the harbour of La Rochelle and the parc Laleu, and a 1.2 km (0.75 mi) run in the stadium André-Barbeau. Throughout this growth with new events appearing, no unified rules ever existed, and as a whole, triathlon remained a minority event on the world stage.

=== Modern beginnings ===
The first modern swim/bike/run event was held at Mission Bay, San Diego, California, on September 25, 1974. The race was conceived and directed by two members of the San Diego Track Club, Jack Johnstone and Don Shanahan. Johnstone recalls that he was a part of the '70s jogging craze in America and that after entering a few races, he was not regaining his "mediocre fitness" despite having been a member of the 1957 Collegiate and AAU All-American swim teams. Then in 1973, Johnstone learned of the Dave Pain Birthday Biathlon, a 7.2 km (4.5 mi) run followed by what was billed as a quarter-mile (0.4 km) swim (the actual distance was only between 200 and 300 yards). The following year, after competing in the event for the second time and placing in the top 10, Johnstone desired more of this style of race and with equal emphasis on the swim. So, he petitioned the chairman of the San Diego Track Club, who told him he would add a race to the club calendar. The rest of the race was up to Johnstone to organise, though, and at the same time, he was to contact Don Shanahan, so there would not be too many "weird" races on the club schedule. Shanahan told Johnstone that he wanted to include a biking leg to the race; whilst hesitant, Johnstone agreed to the addition. When naming the event, the pair used the unofficially agreed naming system for multisport events, already used for pentathlon, heptathlon, and decathlon. So, they used the Greek prefix tri (three) for the number of events, followed by the already familiar athlon, hence naming the event the Mission Bay Triathlon. Neither founder had heard of the French events; both believed their race was a unique idea.

On Wednesday, September 25, 1974, the race started. It began with a run of a 4.8 km (3 mi) loop, followed by biking twice around Fiesta Island for a total of 8.0 km (5 mi). Entrants would then get off the bikes, take their shoes off, and run into the water to swim to the mainland. That was followed by running in bare feet, then swimming again along the bay, then one last swim up to the entrance of Fiesta Island, and a final crawl up a steep dirt bank to finish. Most participants were not skilled swimmers, so Johnstone recruited his 13-year-old son to float on his surfboard and act as lifeguard. Some participants took longer than expected, and it began to get dark as they finished their swims. Shanahan recalls they pulled up a few cars and turned on the headlights so the athletes could see. Johnstone and Shanahan were surprised by the large number of entrants (46), mainly coming from local running clubs. Two notable entrants, Judy and John Collins, four years later founded the event that brought international attention to the new sport: the Hawaii Ironman.

=== European migration ===
The first European triathlon was held on 30 August 1980 in Plzeň, Czechoslovakia. The Netherlands, Belgium, and West Germany followed, each of them hosting an event in 1981, but media coverage of these events was almost nonexistent.

Then in 1982, event organiser IMG, working in partnership with the American channel CBS (direct competitor of ABC, which held the exclusive rights to Hawaii), created a new event that would take place in Europe. The initial aim was to establish a new premier competition, the European Triathlon, with the goal of being of the same size and prestige to directly compete with that of Hawaii. Originally, the event was to be hosted in Monaco, but with the death of Princess Grace in September 1982, the previous agreements fell through. IMG refused to cancel the event, so it was reorganised to be hosted in Nice, France. The first Nice Triathlon was held on 20 November 1982, where 57 competitors took the start, for an ill-defined competition that consisted of 1,500 m (0.93 mi) of swimming, 100 km (62 mi) of cycling, and running a marathon. In December of that year the national television station France 2 broadcast a program, Voyage au bout de la souffrance (Journey to the End of Suffering) which detailed the events of the Nice Triathlon. This program introduced the sport to the general public. Some fans of traditional sports strongly criticised this new practice, as seven of the entrants were hospitalised due to the swim, as the temperature of the Mediterranean was only 14 °C (57 °F). Despite this criticism, IMG's plan succeeded and throughout the 1980s. The Nice Triathlon was, alongside Hawaii, one of the two important long-distance races each year for both prize money and media attention.

The year 1985 had the creation of the first international triathlon structure, the European Triathlon Union (ETU), with the objectives to federate the triathlon structures in each European country and to act as a counterbalance to American triathlon in the creation of a future worldwide federation. The following year, the 11 nations that composed the ETU met in Brussels to standardise the national structures of each European country. During this time, France dominated discussions, as it was the only federation recognised by its own National Olympic Committee. With the legitimacy from CONADET, forerunner of the French Triathlon Federation (FFTri), which has been organising triathlon in France since 1984, the French system became standard all over Europe.

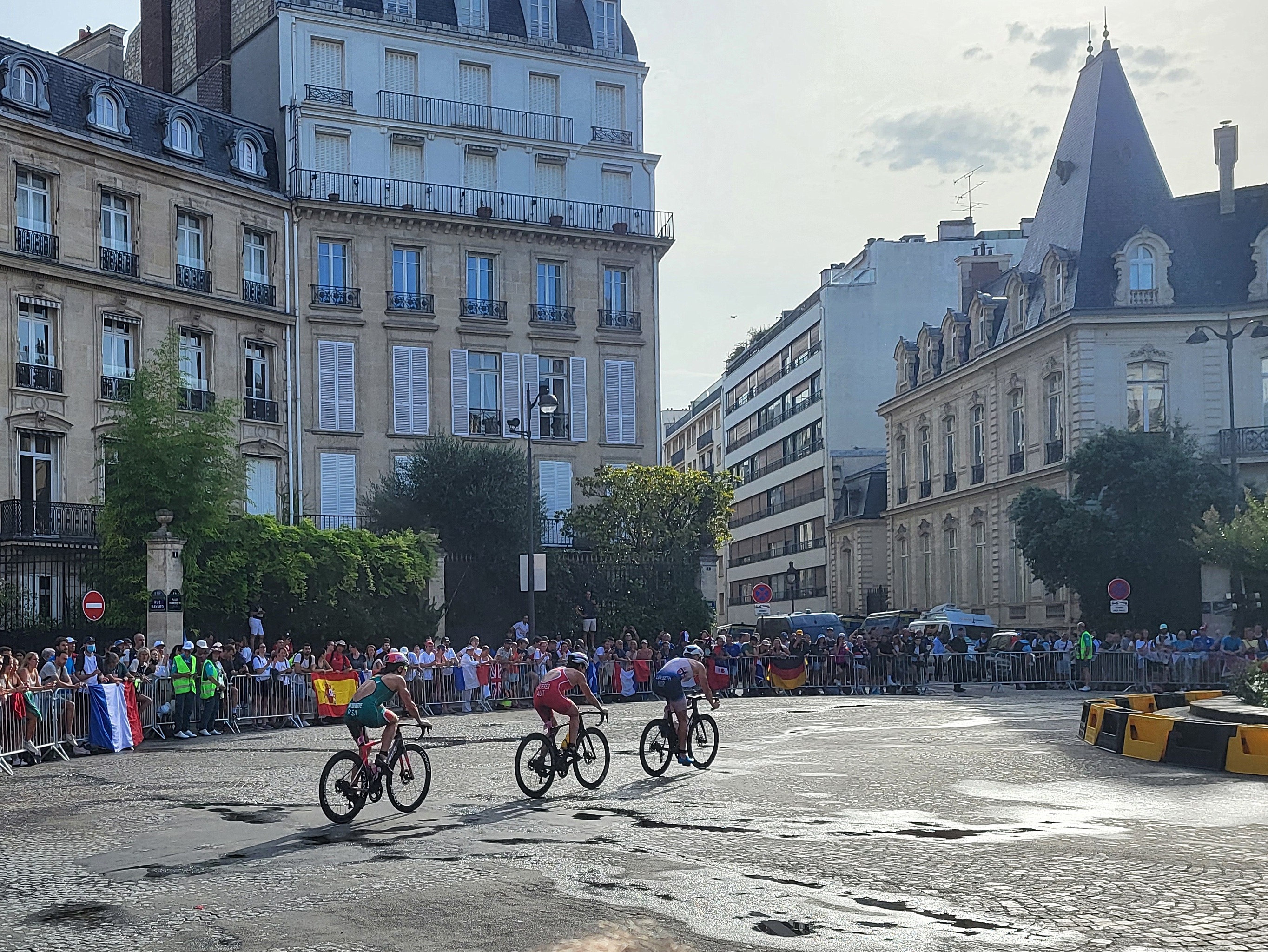
Bike leg

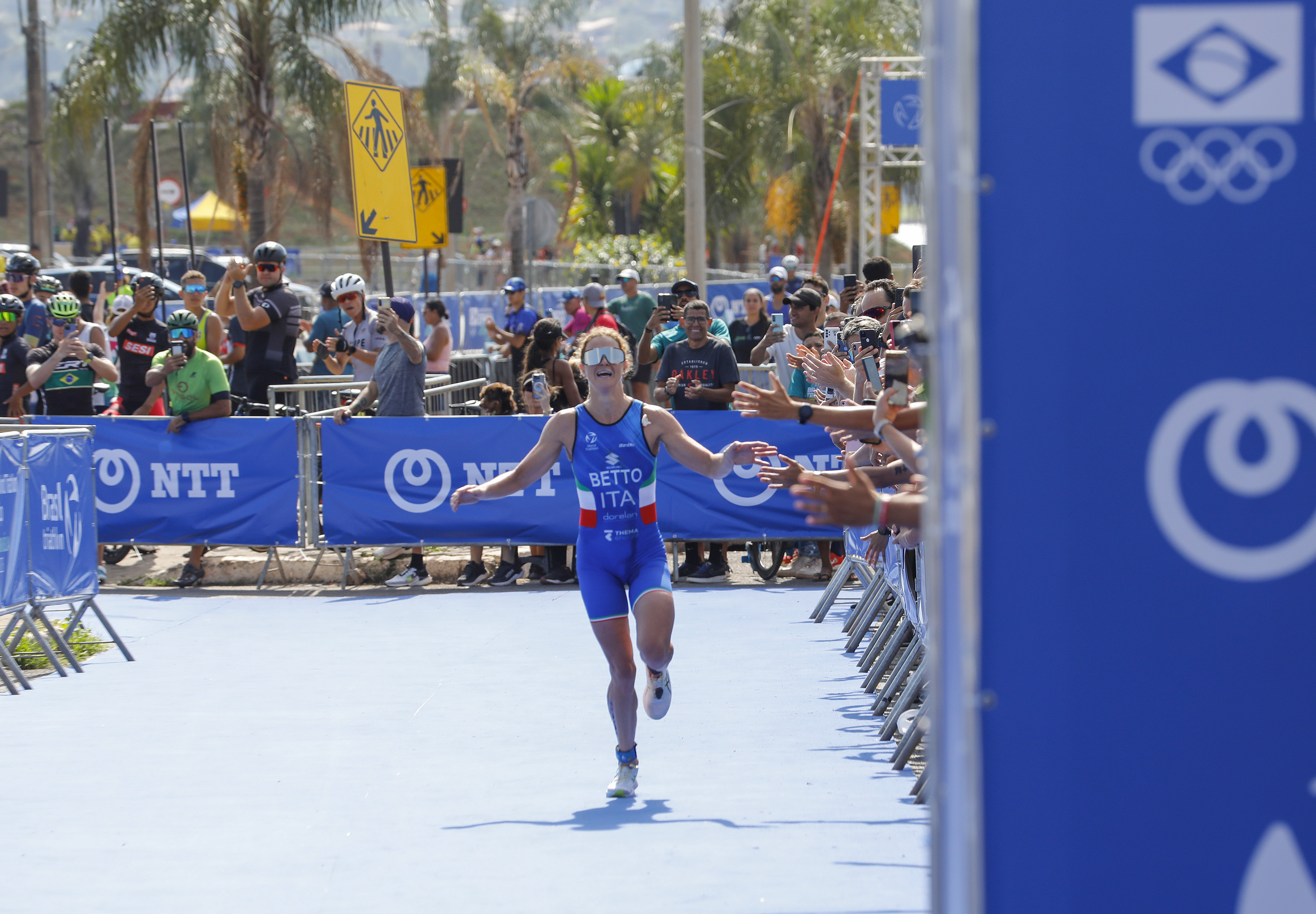
Running leg

=== A global federation ===
The first attempt to create a global triathlon entity was the Triathlon Federation International (TFI), it had only 22 members, most of which were national European federations. But immediately, fights of influences broke out between the European and UK-American federations over many issues, particularly in view of a favourable vote system for the ETU; this caused immediate fracturing and the TFI never fully established itself.

Around the same time, Canadian Les McDonald held talks with Juan Antonio Samaranch, then president of the International Olympic Committee. Samaranch had already declared his intention to add triathlon to the Olympic Games as fast as possible, and assured that triathlon could appear as a demonstration sport at the 1992 Olympic Games in Barcelona, but only under the auspices of the International Union of Modern Pentathlon and Biathlon (UIPMB). Many within the triathlon community were unhappy with the arrangement, wishing for their own federation not to be held as part of UIPMB. Unable to accept the offer, Samaranch established an Olympic working committee for triathlon in an effort to form a consensus on an Olympic route for the sport. McDonald was selected as president of the committee, while Sweden's Sture Jonasson was elected as secretary.

Then in February 1989, an informal meeting was held in Vancouver, Canada, where members of the working committee worked nonstop for a week on the statutes and regulations of the future International Triathlon Union (ITU). Then on 1 April 1989, 30 national federations attended the first ITU Congress in Avignon, France. After further discussions on the way forward to reach the Olympics, including the refusal to follow the path of the UIPMB and how triathlon should develop both economically and as a sport, the Congress endorsed the creation of the ITU and elected its first executive committee. McDonald was elected president. The city of Avignon was also given the honour of hosting the first world championship.

In 1991, the IOC recognized the ITU as the sole governing body for the sport of triathlon at its 97th session in Birmingham, UK. In 1993, the Pan American Games approved triathlon for competition at the 1995 Pan Am Games in Mar del Plata, Argentina. Then in September 1994, triathlon was added to the Olympic program as a medal earning sport at the 2000 Olympic Games in Sydney, Australia.

== Organisations ==
The International Triathlon Union (now known as World Triathlon) was founded in 1989 as the international governing body of the sport, with the chief goal, at that time, of putting triathlon on the Olympic program. The World Triathlon sanctions and organises the World Triathlon Series and the World Triathlon Cup races each year, with annual world champions crowned each year for elite professional triathletes, junior pro triathletes, and age-group athletes. World Triathlon races are conducted in a draft legal format for the bike leg, whereas drafting is not permitted at the amateur level. In addition, the ITU has a Long-Distance Triathlon series.

The World Triathlon Corporation (WTC) is a private company that sanctions and organises the Ironman and Ironman 70.3 races each year. These races serve as qualifying events for their own annual world championships. The Ironman World Championship is held annually in Kailua-Kona, Hawaii, in October, while the Ironman 70.3 World Championship is held in September and changes location each year. The "Ironman" and "Iron" brands are property of the WTC. Therefore, long-distance multisport events organized by groups other than the WTC may not officially be called "Ironman" or "Iron" races. For its part, the ITU does not sanction WTC races; however, USA Triathlon (USAT) uses a combination of World Triathlon and WTC rules to sanction WTC's branded events.

Many other organisations exist beginning with local clubs that may host a single small race once per year to companies like the Challenge Family brand that produces long-distance events around the world, which includes events like Challenge Roth. International Ultra-Triathlon Association (IUTA) is the official governing body of Ultratriathlon, which involves triathlon in distances longer than an iron-distance race. Additionally, each nation, generally, has a sanctioning body for triathlon events in their respective country with regard to athletes competing and qualifying for Olympic competition.

The Professional Triathletes Organisation (PTO), an athlete-owned body that represents non-drafting professional triathletes, was launched in 2016. The organisation focuses on promoting the athletes and their performances with high-quality international broadcasts. In 2022 The PTO launched the PTO Tour, the first series of pro-triathlon 'majors' each with a prize purse of $1M including the PTO Canadian Open, Collins Cup and PTO US Open. A unique aspect of the Professional Triathletes Organization (PTO) is that it is an athlete-owned entity.

The symbol for triathlon in the Olympics

=== Conflict ===
Two major rule making bodies, the ITU and WTC, had an overlap of rules and authority, an issue which began to create conflict in the 2000s. This culminated in 2005 when the ITU and USAT asked all national triathlon federations to refuse to continue sanctioning any WTC events. The reasons for this stemmed from WTC not recognising the ITU as the sport's governing body as WTC was attempting to set up their own federation. Furthermore, ITU and USAT argued against supporting WTC because they were a profit driven organisation, that it was directly conflicting with ITU titles, such as the long and standard distance world championship, and that the WTC was not following World Anti-Doping Agency (WADA) rules. If ITU member nations did not comply with International Olympic Committee (IOC) Charter rules they risked being excluded from the Olympic program. However, in 2006, the ITU backed down on its stance allowing national federations to once again sanction WTC events. This was due to an out-of-court settlement days before a lawsuit was to be argued at the Court of Arbitration for Sport. This settlement had a large effect on WTC races, including WADA membership for the WTC and out-of-competition testing for elite athletes.

Since 2008, coinciding with leadership changes at both the ITU and WTC, the two organisations have been steadily working together. Efforts in 2012 and 2014 resulted in the announcement that Ironman would standardise the rule set for its 2015 races and would start the unification toward ITU rules on long-distance racing with specific interest on the drafting and penalty rules.

In 2017, the ITU and WTC signed a memorandum of understanding in which the two organisations stated they will:

- Harmonise anti-doping efforts
- Fully establish the ITU as the singular international federation for triathlon
- Develop a unified athlete focused rule set for specific distance categories
- Align efforts to foster the growth and development of the sport

== Race formats ==
Name	Swim	Bicycle	Run	Notes
Kids of Steel	100–750 m (110–820 yd)	5–15 km (3.1–9.3 mi)	1–5 km (0.62–3.11 mi)	Distances vary with age of athlete. See: Ironkids
Novice (Australia)	300 m (330 yd)	8 km (5.0 mi)	2 km (1.2 mi)	Standard novice distance course in Australia (often called enticer triathlons).
3–9–3 (New Zealand)	300 m (330 yd)	9 km (5.6 mi)	3 km (1.9 mi)	Standard novice distance course in New Zealand.
Super Sprint	400 m (0.25 mi)	10 km (6.2 mi)	2.5 km (1.6 mi)	Standard Super Sprint course, also used for individual legs of the Olympic and World Mixed Relay events. It is shorter compared to the sprint race and is often based around swimming pools.
Novice (Europe)	400 m (0.25 mi)	20 km (12 mi)	5 km (3.1 mi)	Standard novice/fitness distance course in Europe.
Sprint	750 m (0.47 mi)	20 km (12 mi)	5 km (3.1 mi)	Half the Olympic distance. For pool-based races, a 400 or 500 m (1,300 or 1,600 ft) swim is common.
Olympic (normal)	1.5 km (0.93 mi)	40 km (25 mi)	10 km (6.2 mi)	Also known as "international distance", "standard course", "intermediate" (USAT designation), or "short course".
Triathlon 70.3	1.9 km (1.2 mi)	90 km (56 mi)	21.1 km (13.1 mi)	Also known as "middle distance", "70.3" (total miles travelled), "long" (USAT designation), or "half-ironman", this race has become more popular around the world since 2005.
T100	2 km (1.2 mi)	80 km (50 mi)	18 km (11 mi)	Popularised by the T100 Triathlon series.
Long Distance (O2)	3.0 km (1.9 mi)	80 km (50 mi)	20 km (12 mi)	Double Olympic Distance distance of the World Triathlon Long Distance Championships.
Triathlon 140.6	3.9 km (2.4 mi)	181 km (112 mi)	42.2 km (26.2 mi)	Also known as "long distance", "full distance", "140.6" (total miles travelled), or "Ironman Triathlon".
Long Distance (O3)	4.0 km (2.5 mi)	120 km (75 mi)	30 km (19 mi)	So-called triple Olympic Distance, distance of the World Triathlon Long Distance Championships most years including 2016.

Triathlons longer than full distance are classed as ultra-triathlons.

Triathlons are not necessarily restricted to these prescribed distances. Distances can be any combination of distance set by race organizers to meet various distance constraints or to attract a certain type of athlete.

The standard Olympic distance of 1.5/40/10 km (0.93/24.8/6.2 miles) was created by longtime triathlon race director Jim Curl in the mid-1980s, after he and partner Carl Thomas produced the U.S. Triathlon Series (USTS) between 1982 and 1997.

Sprint triathlons are the most common triathlon distance in the United States. In 2022, for example, there were 839 USAT sanctioned sprint triathlons, more than all other distances combined.

In addition to the above distances, two new long-distance events have appeared, the 111 and 222 events. The 111 distance is 1 km (0.62 mi) swimming, 100 km (62 mi) bicycling and 10 km (6.2 mi) running, totalling 111 km (69 mi). The 222 distance is double that.

Most triathlons are individual events. Another format is relay triathlons, where a team of competitors take turns to compete at a race; each competitor must do a segment of swimming, cycling and running. The World Triathlon Mixed Relay Championships began with two separate classifications for men and women. In 2009, it adopted a 4×4 mixed relay format, where each team has two men and two women. The triathlon at the Youth Olympic Games also has a 4× mixed relay since 2010, and the event was introduced at the 2020 Summer Olympics.

The World Triathlon accepts a 5% margin of error in the cycle and run course distances. Though there can be some variation in race distances, particularly among short triathlons, most triathlons conform to one of those above standards.

== Race organization ==
In general, participation in a triathlon requires an athlete to register and sign up in advance of the actual race. After registration, racers are often provided a race number, colored swim cap, and, if the event is being electronically timed, a timing band. Athletes will either be provided or briefed on details of the course, rules, and any problems to look out for (road conditions, closures, traffic lights, aid stations). At a major event, such as an Ironman or a long course championship, triathletes may be required to set up and check-in their bike in the transition area a day or two before the race start, leaving it overnight and under guard.

On the day of the race, before the start of competition, athletes will generally be provided with a bike rack to hold their bicycle and a small section of ground space for shoes, clothing, etc. in the transition area. In some triathlons, there are two transition areas, one for the swim/bike change, then one for the bike/run change at a different location.

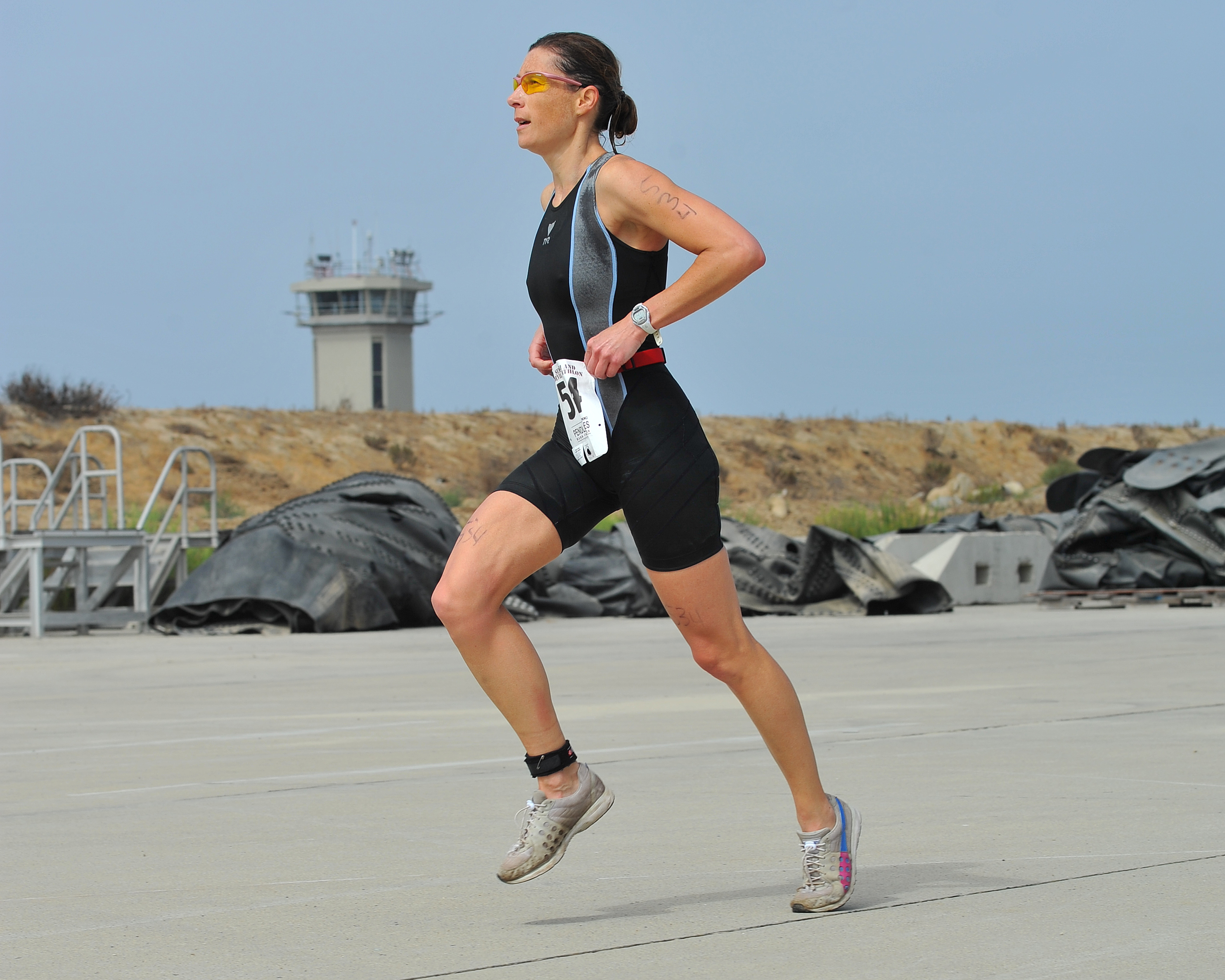
Competition and pressure for faster times have led to the development of specialized triathlon clothing that is adequate for both swimming and cycling, such as speedsuits.

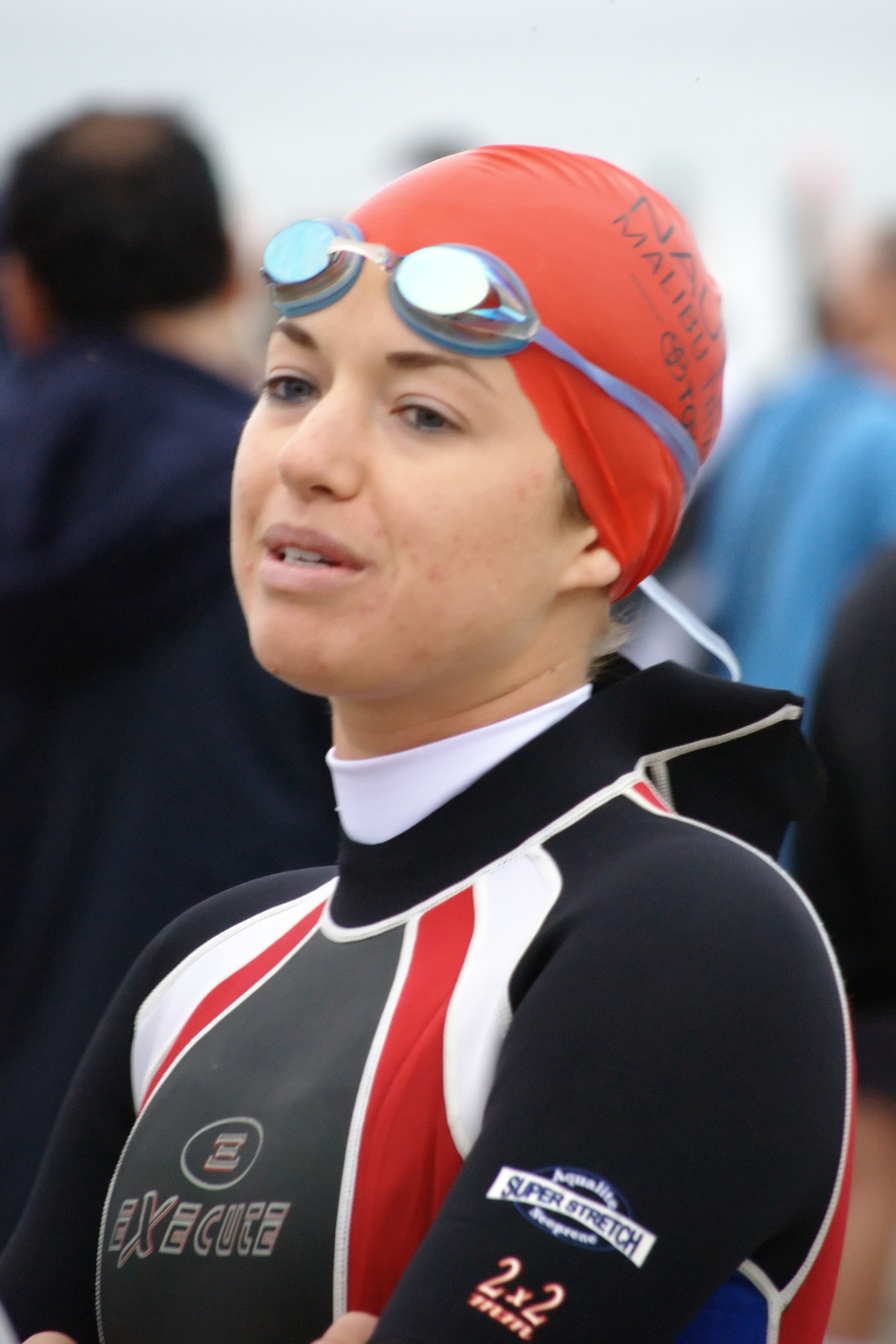
Reality TV's "Survivor" contestant, Parvati Shallow, dressed to compete in the 2008 Nautica Triathlon Malibu Individual Open for females.

Racers are generally categorized into separate professional and amateur categories. Amateurs, who make up the large majority of triathletes, are often referred to as "age groupers" since they are typically further classified by sex and age; which offers the opportunity to compete against others of one's own gender and age group. The age groups are defined in five- or ten-year intervals. There is typically a lower age limit; which can vary from race to race. In some triathlons, heavier amateur athletes may have the option to compete against others closer to their own weight since weight is often considered an impediment to speed. As an example, under USA Triathlon rules, "Clydesdale" athletes are those men over 100 kg (220 lb), while "Athena" athletes are women over 75 kg (165 lb). Other races and organizations can choose whether or not to offer Clydesdale- and Athena-type divisions and set their own weight standards.

Depending on the type and size of the race, there may be any of the following methods implemented to start the race. In a mass start, all athletes enter the water and begin the competition following a single start signal. In wave start events, smaller groups of athletes begin the race every few minutes. An athlete's wave is usually determined either by age group or by predicted swim time. Wave starts are more common in shorter races where a large number of amateur athletes are competing. Another option is individual time trial starts, where athletes enter the water one at a time, a few seconds apart.

The swim leg can occur in any available body of water, whether a natural body of water or a swimming pool. Swim legs not occurring in a swimming pool are considered open water swimming where the course typically proceeds around a series of marked buoys before athletes exit the water near the transition area. Racers exit out of the water, enter the transition area, and change from their swim gear and into their cycling gear. Competition and pressure for faster times have led to the development of specialized triathlon clothing that is adequate for both swimming and cycling, allowing many racers to have a transition that consists of only removing their wetsuit, cap, and goggles and pulling on a helmet and cycling shoes. In some cases, racers leave their cycling shoes attached to their bicycle pedals and slip their feet into them while riding. Some triathletes don't wear socks, decreasing their time spent in transition even more.

The cycling stage proceeds around a marked course, typically on public roads. In many cases, especially smaller triathlons, roads are not closed to automobiles; however, traffic coordinators are often present to help control traffic. Typically, the cycling stage finishes back at the same transition area. Racers enter the transition area, rack their bicycles, and quickly change into running shoes before heading out for the final stage. The running stage usually ends at a separate finish line near the transition area.

In most races, "aid stations" located on the bike and run courses provide water and energy drinks to the athletes as they pass by. Aid stations at longer events may often provide various types of food as well, including such items as energy bars, energy gels, fruit, cookies, soup, and ice.

Once the triathletes have completed the event, there is typically another aid station for them to get water, fruit, and other post-race refreshments. Occasionally, at the end of larger or longer events, the provided amenities and post-race celebrations may be more elaborate.

== Rules of triathlon ==
While specific rules for triathlon can vary depending on the governing body (e.g. World Triathlon, USA Triathlon), as well as for an individual race venue, there are some basic universal rules. Traditionally, triathlon is an individual sport and each athlete is competing against the course and the clock for the best time. As such, athletes are not allowed to receive assistance from anyone else outside the race, with the exception of race-sanctioned aid volunteers who distribute food and water on the course.

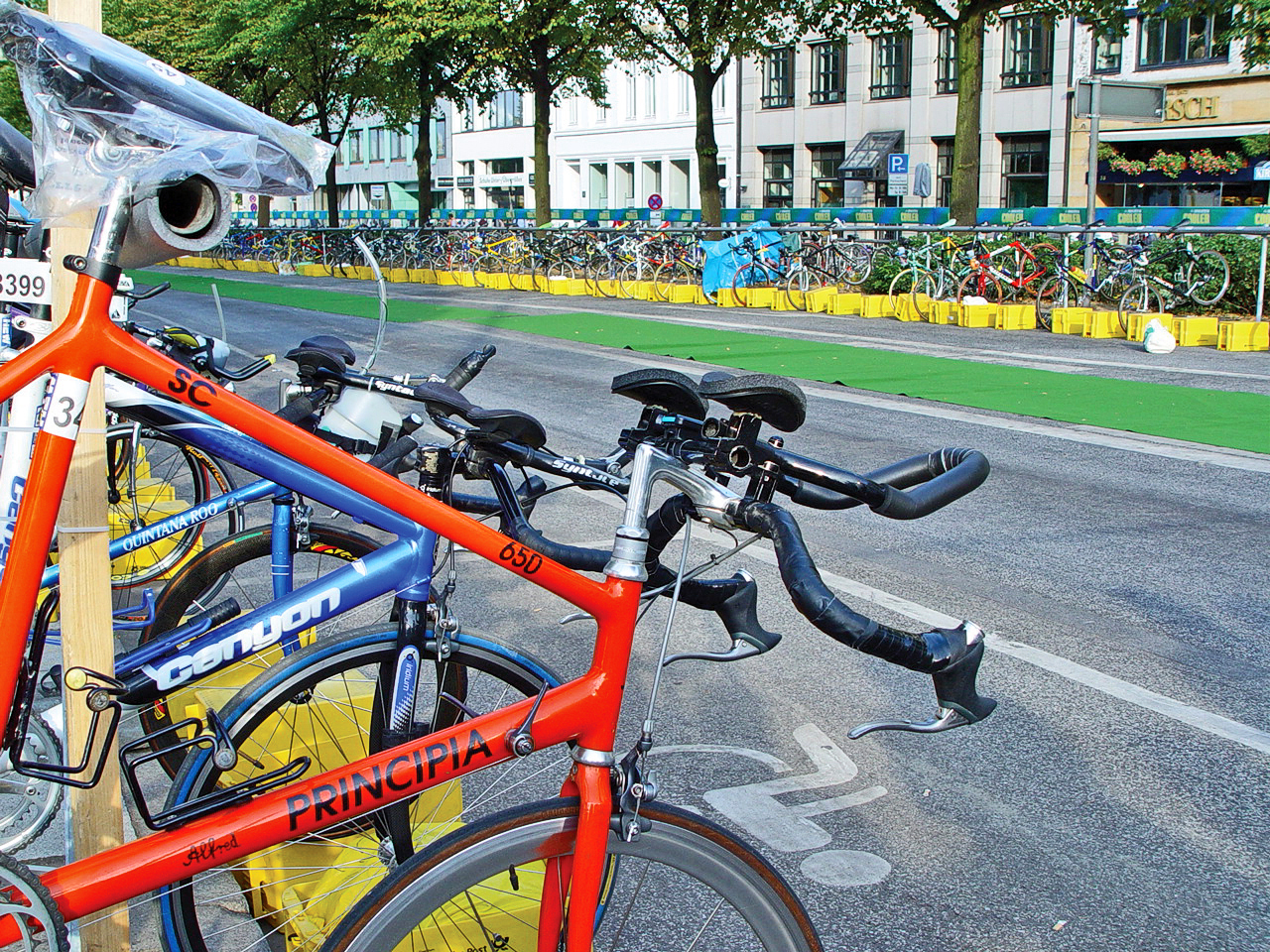
Transition area (bicycles) of Hamburg Triathlon, 2002

Triathlons are timed in five sequential sections:

1. from the start of the swim to the beginning of the first transition (swim time);
2. from the beginning of the first transition to the end of the first transition (T1 time);
3. from the start of the cycling to the end of the cycling leg (cycling time);
4. from the beginning of the second transition to the end of the second transition (T2 time);
5. finally from the start of the run to the end of the run, at which time the triathlon is completed.

Results are usually posted on official websites and will show for each triathlete his/her swim time; cycle time (with transitions included); run time; and total time. Some races also post transition times separately.

Other rules of triathlon vary from race to race and generally involve descriptions of allowable equipment (for example, wetsuits are allowed in USAT events in the swimming stage of some races when the water temperature is below 25.6 °C (78.1 °F)), and prohibitions against interference between athletes. Additionally, the use of flippers or other swim propulsion and flotation aids are illegal in triathlon and can result in disqualification.

One rule involving the cycle leg is that the competitor's helmet must be donned before the competitor mounts (or even takes possession of, in certain jurisdictions) the bike, and it must remain on until the competitor has dismounted; the competitor may not be required to wear the helmet when not on the bicycle (e.g. while repairing a mechanical problem). Failure to comply with this rule will result in disqualification. Additionally, while on the bike course, all bicycles shall be propelled only by human force and human power. Other than pushing a bicycle, any propulsive action brought on by use of the hands is prohibited. Should a competitor's bike malfunction they can proceed with the race as long as they are doing so with their bicycle in tow. There are also strict rules regarding the 'bike mount' line. Competitors may not begin riding their bicycle out of transition until they are over a clearly marked line. Mounting the bike prior to this may incur a penalty (example: a 15-second time penalty at the London 2012 Olympics was imposed on Jonathan Brownlee, a competitor from Great Britain, for mounting his bike too early.)

Other time penalties can be incurred during the race for, among other things, drafting on the bike in a non-drafting race, improper passing, littering on course, and unsportsmanlike conduct.

== Triathlon and fitness ==
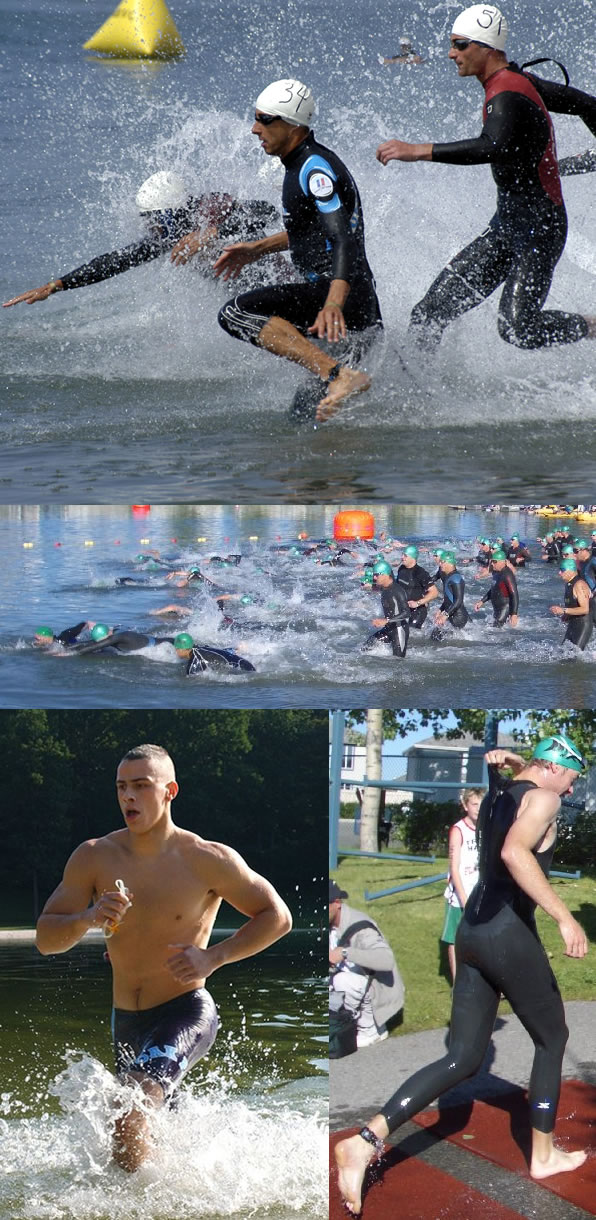
Triathletes competing in the swim component of race. Wetsuits are common but not universal

Participants in triathlon often use the sport to improve or maintain their physical fitness. With each sport being an endurance event, training for a triathlon provides cardiovascular exercise benefits. Additionally, triathletes encounter fewer injuries than those who only use running as part of their exercise routine due to the incorporation of low impact swim and bike training.

Triathletes spend many hours training for competitions, like other endurance event participants. There are three components that have been researched to improve endurance sports performance; aerobic capacity, anaerobic threshold, and economy. They apply to all three events, however, as the exertion and active recovery phases are different for each specific technique, they manifest themselves differently. For example, the main active recovery phase in running, where energy is most recovered and balance regained, is at the start of the midstance phase whereas in cycling it is around the dead bottom centre pedal position. Due to such event based biomechanical variations, and the proficiency of the athlete, these three factors occur differently. For example, an elite runner's highly efficient anaerobic threshold, during running, will only be present to the same extent in their swimming if they develop it to a comparable degree.

Injuries that are incurred from long hours of a single activity are not as common in triathlon as they are in single sport events. The cross-training effect that athletes achieve from training for one sport by doing a second activity applies to triathlon training. Additional activities that triathletes perform for cross-training benefits are yoga, pilates, and weight training.

=== Swimming ===
Triathletes will often use their legs less vigorously and more carefully than other swimmers, conserving their leg muscles for the cycle and run to follow. Many triathletes use altered swim strokes to compensate for turbulent, aerated water and to conserve energy for a long swim. In addition, the majority of triathlons involve open-water (outdoor) swim stages, rather than pools with lane markers. As a result, triathletes in the swim stage must jockey for position, and can gain some advantage by drafting, following a competitor closely to swim in their slipstream. Triathletes will often use "dolphin kicking" and diving to make headway against waves, and body surfing to use a wave's energy for a bit of speed at the end of the swim stage. Also, open-water swims necessitate "sighting": raising the head to look for landmarks or buoys that mark the course. A modified stroke allows the triathlete to lift the head above water to sight without interrupting the swim or wasting energy.

Because open water swim areas are often cold and because wearing a wetsuit provides a competitive advantage, specialized triathlon wetsuits have been developed in a variety of styles to match the conditions of the water. For example, wetsuits that are sleeveless and cut above the knee are designed for warmer waters, while still providing buoyancy. Wetsuits are legal in sanctioned events at which the surface water temperature is 26 °C (79 °F) or less. In non-sanctioned events or in "age group" classes where most racers are simply participating for the enjoyment of the sport instead of vying for official triathlon placing, wetsuits can often be used at other temperatures. Race directors will sometimes discourage or ban wetsuits if the water temperature is above 29 °C (84 °F) due to overheating that can occur while wearing a wetsuit. Other rules have been implemented by race organizers regarding both wetsuit thickness as well as the use of "swim skins;" which need to be considered by those participating in future triathlons. Some triathlon sanctioning bodies have placed limits on the thickness of the wetsuit material. Under World Triathlon and some national governing bodies' rules no wetsuit may have a thickness of more than 5 mm (0.20 in).

=== Cycling ===
Triathlete in the cycling portion of the event

Triathlon cycling can differ from most professional bicycle racing depending on whether drafting is allowed during competition. In some competitions, like those governed by USA Triathlon and the World Triathlon Corporation, drafting is not allowed, and thus the cycling portion more closely resembles individual time trial racing. In other races, such as those in the World Triathlon Series and World Triathlon Cup racing, drafting and the formation of pelotons are legal. This places an emphasis on running performance as several athletes will enter the bike to run transition at the same time due to drafting.

Triathlon bicycles are generally optimized for aerodynamics, having special handlebars called aero-bars or tri-bars, aerodynamic wheels, and other components. Triathlon bikes use a specialized geometry, including a steep seat-tube angle both to improve aerodynamics and to spare muscle groups needed for running. At the end of the bike segment, triathletes also often cycle with a higher cadence (revolutions per minute), which serves in part to keep the muscles loose and flexible for running.

=== Running ===
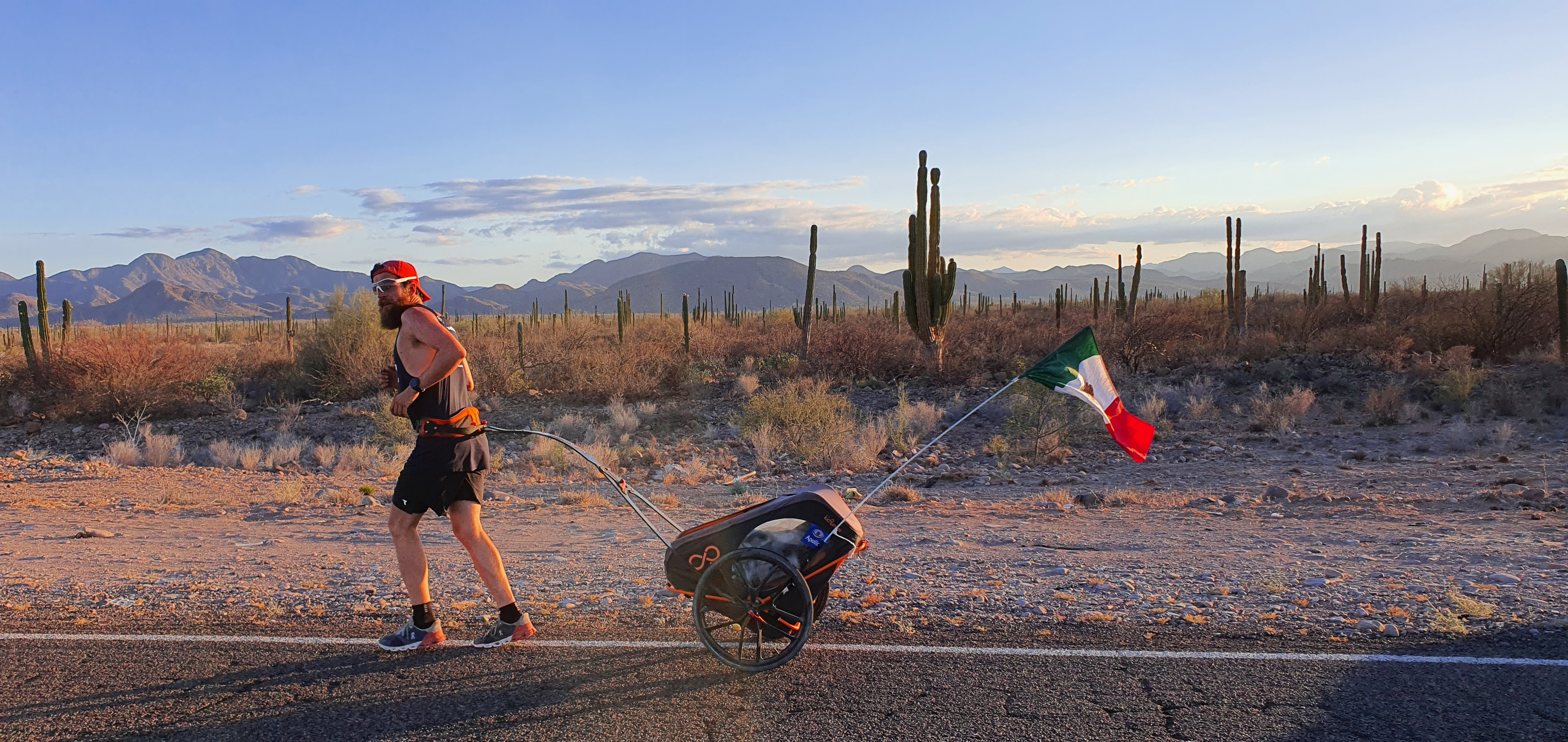
Jonas Deichmann during world record-breaking 26,000 km triathlon

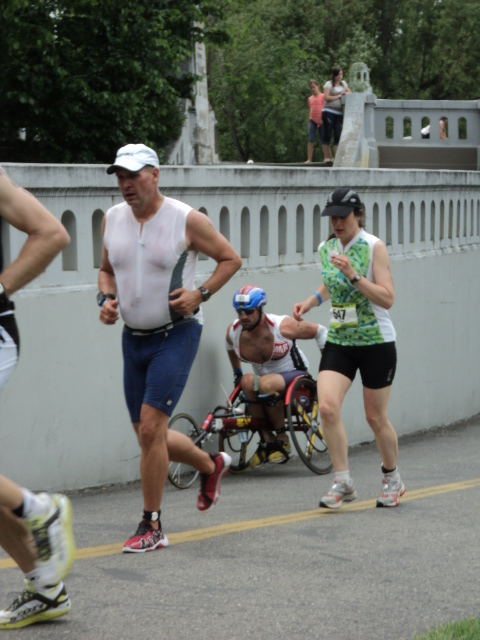
An athlete competes in a wheelchair amongst runners at Ironman 70.3 on the Boise Greenbelt.

The primary distinguishing feature of running in a triathlon is that it occurs after the athlete has already been exercising in two other disciplines for an extended period of time, so many muscles are already tired. The effect of switching from cycling to running can be profound; first-time triathletes are often astonished at their muscle weakness, which may be caused by lactate accumulation and the bizarre, sometimes painful sensation in their thighs a few hundred yards into the run, and discover that they run at a much slower pace than they are accustomed to in training. Triathletes train for this phenomenon through transition workouts known as "bricks": back-to-back workouts involving two disciplines, most commonly cycling and running.

=== Transition ===
The change over from sport to sport takes place in a designated transition area. The transition provides a staging area where bicycles, running shoes, hydration and other gear is set up ready to be used during the course of the event. The first transition, known as T1, is between the swimming and bicycle segments of the race. The second transition, T2, is between the bicycle and running segments. Most events have one common transition area for both T1 and T2, while some point to point events have two separate transition areas. The time spent in transition is a timed segment and contributes towards the overall finishing time of the event. Races can hinge on transition skills, either by gaining or losing time in transition itself, or because of time penalties taken for faulty changeovers. As such, transition is commonly described during races as the 'fourth discipline.'

== Notable events ==
=== World Triathlon organised events ===
World competitions

- World Triathlon Series
- World Triathlon Cup
- World Triathlon Long Distance Championships
- World Triathlon Mixed Relay Championships

=== World Triathlon sanctioned events ===
==== Olympics ====
The sport made its debut on the Olympic program at the Sydney Games in 2000 over the Olympic Distance (swim: 1,500 m (1,650 yd) – bike: 40 km (24.9 mi) – run: 10 km (6.2 mi)). A mixed relay event was introduced, using four Super Sprint distance legs, in the Tokyo Games in 2021.

==== Paralympics ====
Paratriathlon at the Summer Paralympics debuted at the 2016 Summer Paralympics held in Rio de Janeiro, Brazil. Paratriathlon is a variant of the triathlon for athletes with a physical disability. The Paralympic event originally scheduled a sprint race with athletes competing in six categories according to the nature of their physical impairments.

Other multi-sport events

- Triathlon at the African Games
- Triathlon at the Asian Games
- Triathlon at the Commonwealth Games
- Triathlon at the Island Games
- Triathlon at the Pan American Games
- Triathlon at the Southeast Asian Games

=== Other events ===
Thousands of individual triathlons are held around the world each year. Some are local and quite small, others with hundreds of participants. Many give their participants completion medals, with additional awards for placement in their age or other category group. A few of these races are well known because they have a long history or because they have particularly gruelling courses and race conditions.

- Hawaii Ironman World Championship, Kona, Hawaii. First held in 1978 on Oahu, only five years after the sport of triathlon was founded; it was later moved to Kailua-Kona on the island of Hawaii. The cycling stage of the race covers more than 160 km (100 mi) over lava flats on the big island of Hawaii, where mid-day temperatures often reach over 43 °C (110 °F) and cross-winds sometimes blow at 89 km/h (55 mph). The race is often challenging even to competitors with experience in other iron-distance events. Being a world championship race, only competitors that meet qualifying guidelines can enter, typically qualifying slots are awarded in other Ironman sanctioned events.
- Nice Triathlon, Nice, France. A race that existed until 2002 when the course was adopted by the WTC as Ironman France. During the 1980s the Nice Long Distance triathlon (swim 4 km (2.5 mi), bike 120 km (75 mi), run 30 km (19 mi)) was, alongside the World Championships in Kona, one of the two important races each year with prize money and media attention. Mark Allen won here 10 consecutive times. The World Triathlon's Long Distance is a Nice-Distance race except during a short period from late 2006 to early 2008, in which it was 3 km (1.9 mi) + 80 km (50 mi) + 2 km (1.2 mi).
- Enduroman Arch to Arc. A 465 km (289 mi) triathlon from Marble Arch, London to the Arc de Triomphe, Paris. Run from Marble Arch in London to Dover 140 km (87 mi), swim the English Channel 35 km (22 mi) to Calais, and then cycle 291 km (181 mi) from Calais to Paris. For this challenge, the clock starts at Marble Arch and stops at Arc de Triomphe. Only 46 people in history have completed this event.
- St. Anthony's, St. Petersburg, Florida. Held in the last week of April every year, this race attracts professional and amateur triathletes from around the world. One of the largest Olympic Distance triathlon in the U.S. with over 4,000 participants each year.
- Escape from Alcatraz, San Francisco, California. This non-standard-length race begins with a 2.4 km (1.5 mi) swim in frigid San Francisco Bay waters from Alcatraz Island to shore, followed by an 29 km (18 mi) bicycle and 13 km (8 mi) run in the extremely hilly terrain of the San Francisco Bay Area. The run includes the notorious "Sand Ladder", a 400-step staircase climb up a beachside cliff.
- Wildflower is a half-iron distance race held on the first weekend of May at Lake San Antonio on the Central Coast of California since 1983. Known for a particularly hilly course, it has expanded now to include three races of different lengths and is one of the largest triathlon events in the world, with over 8,000 athletes attending each year.
- Life Time Fitness Triathlon Series. Life Time Tri Series is a series of 5 Olympic distance races: The Lifetime Fitness in Minneapolis, the NYC Triathlon in New York City, the Chicago Triathlon, the LA Triathlon in Los Angeles, and the U.S. Open in Dallas. There is a combined $1.5 Million prize purse at stake for the professionals who come from around the world to take part in the series.
- Hy-Vee Triathlon, started in 2007 by the mid-west grocery store chain Hy-Vee. The race had the richest prize purse awarded for a single triathlon. The race was formally part of the World Triathlon Cup series from 2008 to 2010 and briefly served as the World Triathlon Corporation's 5150 Series U.S. Championships.
- Norseman Xtreme Triathlon, Hardangerfjord, Norway. Norseman is an Ironman-distance triathlon that starts with a swim in the Hardangerfjord and finishes on top of a Gaustatoppen mountain at 1,850 m (6,070 ft) above sea level. Famous for its lower temperatures and 5,000 m (16,000 ft) total ascent, this race accepts only 200 competitors each year.
- Ironman 70.3 World Championship
- Grand Prix de Triathlon, the French club championship series sponsored by Lyonnaise des Eaux. The circuit comprises five triathlons and by the French Triathlon Federation and attracts professional international triathletes hired by French triathlon clubs.
- Triathlon EDF Alpe d'Huez, established in 2006 by the 2002 Long Distance World Champion Cyrille Neveu, is one of the best known single triathlons in France.
- Challenge Gallipoli Triathlon, Gallipoli Peninsula Historical Site, Çanakkale, Turkey for swimming: 1.9 km (1.2 mi), biking: 90 km (56 mi) and running: 21 km (13 mi).
- Challenge Istanbul in Istanbul, Turkey. The world's first ever intercontinental triathlon event for biking: 40 km (25 mi), swimming: 2.3 km (1.4 mi) and running: 10 km (6.2 mi).

==== Esports ====
- The Supertri E World Triathlon Championship inaugural 2025 indoor hybrid course combined a pool swim, a treadmill for running, and static bikes for the cycling portion, with virtual portions running on indoor exercise software MyWhoosh. Previously World Triathlon and Super League Triathlon partnered with Zwift for a Esports World Championships in 2022.

== Nonstandard variations ==
- Aquabike, composed of only swimming and cycling stages.
- Aquathlon, composed of only swimming and running stages.
- Swimrun, composed of alternating swimming and running stages without transition.
- Duathlon, composed of only cycling and running stages including Powerman Duathlon
- Equilateral triathlon, a triathlon in which each leg takes approximately equal time.
- Indoor triathlon, consisting of a pool swim, stationary bike, and indoor track or treadmill run.
- Cross triathlon, consists of swimming, mountain biking and trail running. Such races includes the XTERRA Triathlon series.
- Xtreme Triathlon, consists of swimming in cold water, cycling with significant height gain and trail running on mountains. Such races includes the XTRI World Tour.
- Ultraman triathlon, an Ultra-long-distance three-day triathlon covering 510 kilometres (320 mi) in separate stages.
- Winter triathlon, typically includes two events of either cross-country skiing, mountain biking or outdoor-ice speed skating and finishes with running.
- SUPBIKERUN triathlon, consisting of standup paddleboarding (SUP), Trail running and Mountain biking. Designed as an entry-level triathlon.
- Aerothlon (or as sometimes called Alpine Triathlon) is an extreme triathlon format consisting of Mountain Running, Mountain Biking and Paragliding.
- DriTri, composed of a 5K, a 2,000m row, and 300 body-weight reps.

== See also ==
- Ironman Triathlon
- Supertri
- Decathlon
- Duathlon
- List of triathletes
- Pentathlon
- Biathlon
- Quadrathlon
- Tetrathlon
- Triathlon equipment
