= Challenge Gallipoli Triathlon =

Triathlon competition in Turkey

Coordinates: 40.20132°N 26.31589°E

- Host: Gallipoli Peninsula Historical Site, Çanakkale
- Country: Turkey
- Organizer: Turkish Triathlon Federation
- Nations: 18 (2025)
- Athletes: 538 (2025)
- Sports: Triathlon (swimming, biking, running)
- Race length: Swimming: 1.9 km (1.2 mi); Biking: 90 km (56 mi); Running: 21 km (13 mi)

Location of the Challenge Gallipoli Triathlon

Challenge Gallipoli Triathlon is an annual triathlon competition held at the Gallipoli Peninsula Historical Site in Çanakkale, Turkey.

== Overview ==
Organized by the Turkish Triathlon Federation, the event was established in 2021, as the "International Gallipoli Triathlon" (Turkish: Uluslararası Gelibolu Triatlonu). The competition is carried out in the Gallipoli Peninsula Historical Site on the Gallipoli peninsula in Çanakkalee, where the Gallipoli campaign took place in World War I between the Entente powers and the Ottoman Empire in 1915–16. The site eatures many memorials and war graves. The competition became part of the Netherlands-based organization "Challenge Family" in 2024, and was renamed to "Challenge Gallipoli Triathlon".

The competition starts with swimming on a 1.9 km (1.2 mi)-long course in the Gulf of Saros or on the Dardanelles. It continues with a cycling stage consisting of a single 90 km (56 mi)-long tour, following ANZAC Cove, where Australian and New Zealand soldiers landed in 1915, monuments, trenches that witnessed land battles, and the famous Battle of Chunuk Bair, where Mustafa Kemal (Atatürk) fought. Triathletes then set off towards the village of Alçıtepe near Helles Memorial, and complete the race, which consists of three laps along the coastline of the peninsula, at the 21 km (13 mi)-long course in the Gallipoli Peninsula Historical Site, where they started. Male and female triathletes are categorized in the individual event in five-year age groups between 20 and 69, also in men's team, women's team and mixed team events. While in 2024, 511 triathletes, including 367 in the individual category, from 17 countries competed, 538 triathletes from 18 countries participated in the 2025 competition.

== Winners ==
Year	Athlete	Time	Ref.
Men
2024	(Ukraine) Mark Vysotski	4:25:10	
2025	(Turkey) Arif Emre Karaosman	4:43:08	
Women
2024	(Turkey) Simay Ateş	6:04:40	
2025	(Turkey) Nil Savran	7:11:14	
Men's team
2024	(Turkey) Istanbul Triathlon SC	5:06:44	
2025	(Turkey) Fişşekspor	4:20:24	
Women's team
2024	(Russia) RISE Performance Club	4:54:23	
2025	(Turkey) Aries Chicks	5:21:3	)
Mixed team
2024	(Turkey) Fişşekspor	4:41:11	
2025	(Turkey) 3 Benzemez	5:11:09	

== See also ==
- Challenge Istanbul
- Alanya Triathlon
