= Multisport race =

Athletic competition consisting of stages with different sports in each

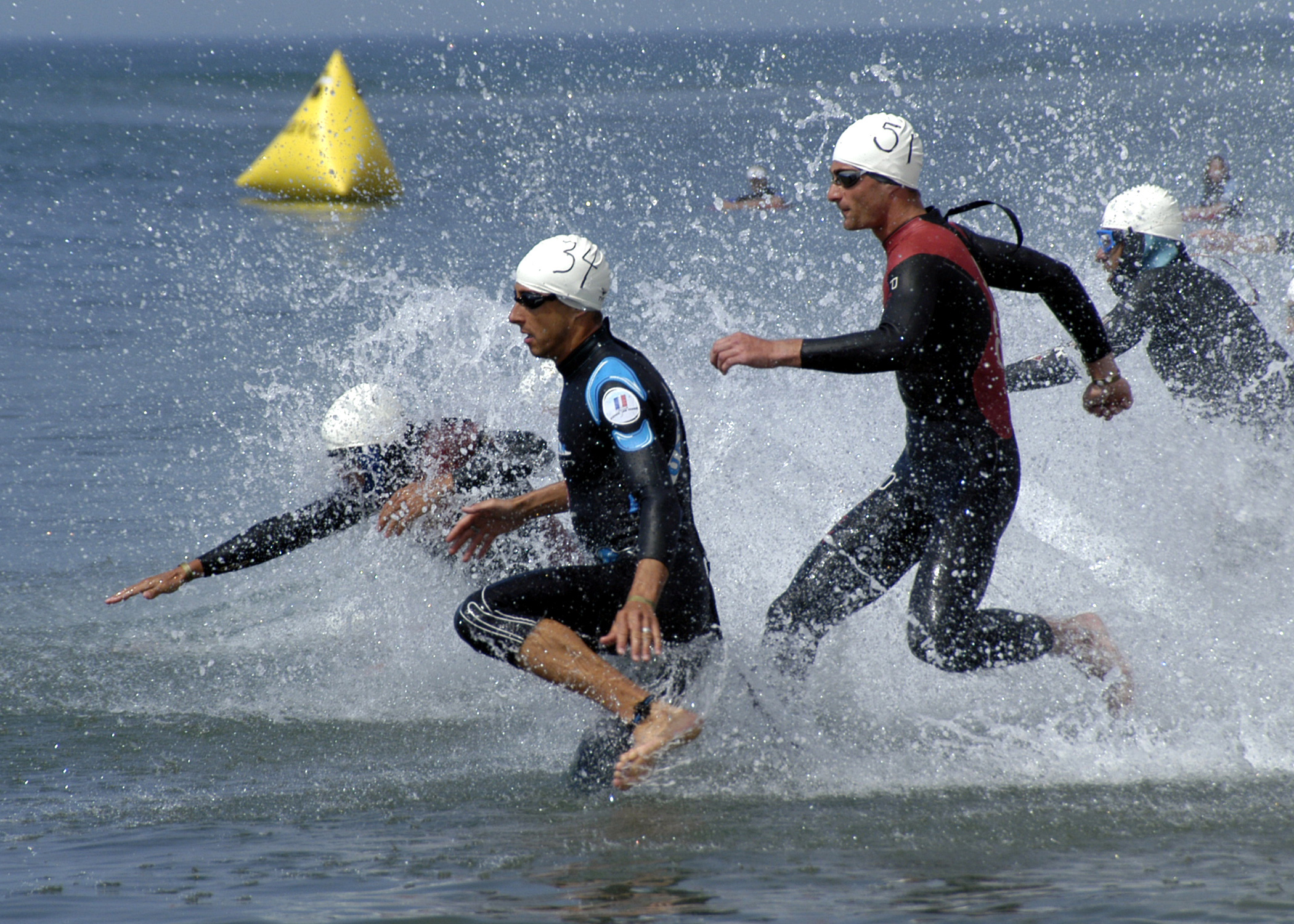
Triathletes begin the swimming stage of the World Military Triathlon.

A multisport competition is a family of athletic competitions in which athletes race in a continuous series of stages or "legs", and rapidly switch from one athletic discipline to another in order to achieve the best overall time. Most multisport events are endurance races, consisting of aerobic activities such as cycling, running, kayaking and cross-country skiing.

Familiar events from the Olympic Games such as the pentathlon, heptathlon, octathlon, decathlon, and modern pentathlon are not usually considered to fall in this category, because their individual components are not held back-to-back.

== Standard multisport events ==
The world of multisport competitions has grown from the older and more traditional triathlon and duathlon competitions, and today includes a large number of variations. There is quite a bit of variation in the naming of these events; the more common and most standardized names are listed here.

| Sport name | Stages | Governing body |
|---|---|---|
| Ski orienteering | Cross-country skiing, orienteering | International Orienteering Federation |
| Triathlon | Swimming, cycling, running | International Triathlon Union |
| Cross triathlon | Swimming, mountain biking, trail running | International Triathlon Union |
| Duathlon | Running, cycling, running | International Triathlon Union |
| Cross duathlon | Mountain biking, trail running | International Triathlon Union |
| Indoor triathlon | | |
| Swimrun | Multiple swim and run (without transition zone) | World Swimrun Federation |
| Aquathlon | Swimming, running | International Triathlon Union |
| Biathle | Running, swimming, running | Union Internationale de Pentathlon Moderne |
| Biathlon | Cross-country skiing, rifle shooting | International Biathlon Union |
| Aquabike | Swimming, cycling | International Triathlon Union |
| Quadrathlon | Swimming, kayaking, cycling, running | World Quadrathlon Federation |
| Rowathlon | Indoor rowing, cycling, running | None—considered an indoor triathlon event |
| Winter triathlon | Running, cycling, cross-country skiing | International Triathlon Union |
| Winter quadrathlon | Cycling, running, cross-country skiing, snowshoeing | World Quadrathlon Federation |

Adventure racing includes races which comprise a number of different stages of different types. In many adventure races, the competitors do not know some or all of the stages before the race, and must handle unexpected challenges. A team normally consists of 4 people, with at least 1 female. All team members must stay together at all times.

== Related events ==
Biathlon, which consists of alternating stages of cross-country skiing and shooting, is often confused with duathlon because of the similarity in names. Some consider biathlon to be a form of multisport event, while others exclude it from the category because the athlete's score includes shooting accuracy in addition to total race time.

Coast to Coast is a multisport race held in New Zealand's South Island. Starting at Kumara Beach on the Tasman Sea and finishing at Sumner Beach on the Pacific Ocean, the 243 km (151 mi) race involves a 3 km run, a 55 km cycle, a 33 km mountain run, a 15 km cycle, a 67 km kayak, and a 70 km cycle.

There are also three military multisports, mainly participated in by militaries at the World Military Games and world championships: aeronautical pentathlon, military pentathlon, and naval pentathlon.
