= Challenge Istanbul =

Triathlon competition in Turkey

Coordinates: 41.081944°N 29.066944°E

- Host: Istanbul
- Country: Turkey
- Organizer: Turkish Triathlon Federation
- Athletes: 680 (2024)
- Sports: Triathlon (biking, swimming, running)
- Dates: Fall
- Race length: Biking: 40 km (25 mi); Swimming: 2.3 km (1.4 mi); Running: 10 km (6.2 mi)
- Website: www.challenge-istanbul.com

Location of the Challenge Istanbul

Challenge Istanbul, also known as Oral-B Challenge Istanbul for sponsorship reasons, is an annual middle-distance triathlon competition held in Istanbul, Turkey. It is the world's first ever intercontinental triathlon event.

== Overview ==
Organized by the Turkish Triathlon Federation, the middle-distance triathlon event was established in 2021, and became part of the Netherlands-based organization "Challenge Family" as Challenge Istanbul, debuting in 2024. It is the first ever intercontinental triathlon competition in the world.

The competition starts with cycling stage consisting of a single 40 km (25 mi)-long tour, running from the Turkish War Academies in Maslak in the European part of the city via Kavacık on the Fatih Sultan Mehmet Bridge, which spans over the Bosporus Strait, to Kanlıca in the Asian part . It continues with swimming on a 2.3 km (1.4 mi)-long course between Kanlıca and Küçüksu Pavilion in the Bosporus Strait. The Triathletes then set off towards Çubuklu at the 10 km (6.2 mi)-long course on the Asian coastline of Bosporus past the waterside mansions and Anatolian Fortress.

In 2024, a total of 680 domestic and foreign triathletes took part at the competition.

== Winners ==
Year	Athlete	Time	Ref.
Men
2024	(Iran) Behzad Nobaripur	2:00:48	
Women
2024	(Turkey) Ece Calp	2:17:20	
Men's team
2024	(Turkey) Kral UBU	1:54:30	
Women's team
2024	(Turkey) Toplasan1	2:19:28	
Mixed team
2024	(Turkey) Fişşekspor	1:56:43	[

== See also ==
- Challenge Gallipoli Triathlon
- Alanya Triathlon
