= International Winter Swimming Association =

- Sport: Winter swimming
- Category: Nonprofit organization
- Abbreviation: IWSA
- Founded: 2006 (Oulu, Finland)
- Headquarters: Oulu, Finland
- President: Mariia Yrjö-Koskinen
- Vice president(s): John Coningham-Rolls, Colin Hill
- Other key staff: Matias Ola, Lars Mack, Aleksandra Kabelis

Official website
- iwsa.me

International Winter Swimming Association (IWSA) is a non-governmental organization registered in Oulu, Finland, which is the governing body of mainly the following winter swimming world events: the Winter Swimming World Championships (WSWC), which is masters championships in the men's and women's age categories (A to J2) and held at two-year intervals and the IWSA World Cup or Winter Swimming Cup, which consists of approximately ten winter season events in different parts of the world. IWSA was founded in 2006 by swimmers from Finland, Great Britain, Russia and Slovakia.

== Board ==
The association board consists of four members and chaired by the President of the IWSA with two vice-presidents. The Board selects venues for IWSA-organised events, co-ordinating with venue management to select appropriate dates for winter swimming events. The basic goal of the IWSA and its board is to ensure the safety and health of swimmers during winter swimming events.

== Rules ==

At the IWSA event site, water is classified into three temperature categories: category A indicates water with temperature below or equal 2 °C (36 °F), category B indicates water with a temperature above 2 °C to 5 °C (36 to 41 °F) (including) and category C denotes water above 5 °C (41 °F). For competitions up to 200 m (660 ft), category A is also permissible, for endurance swim 450 m (1,480 ft) both category B and C are allowed and 1,000 m (3,300 ft) races are held in water of category C. Competition rank scoring is also affected by water category. Winter Swimming World Championships have detailed rules published on the IWSA website. Competitors have individual IWSA-accounts to manage personal information and are assigned an appropriate IWSA identification number (IWSA-ID) that is used to register swimmers and score them at races. The results of the races are published on the IWSA website.

In IWSA-competitions, the best achieved times in each age category are recorded and absolute records on individual men's and women's tracks are also registered. The IWSA's motto is: "No water is too cold."

== Medical requirements for swimmers ==
For competitions for 450 m and 1000 m (1,480 and 3,280 ft), swimmers must first complete a qualifying race on the 200 m (660 ft) track (for competitive swimming for 450 m; 1,480 ft) resp. 450 m (1,480 ft) (for competitive swimming at 1,000 m; 3,300 ft) in water up to 5 °C (41 °F), as evidenced by the AFFIDAVIT declaration form. In addition, the day before these races, there is usually a mandatory health check consisting of measuring the competitor's blood pressure and ECG examination (an earlier ECG examination from their place of residence may also be required).

== See also ==
- Winter Swimming World Championships
