= Mendicino, Italy =

Mendicino
- Comune
- Comune di Mendicino
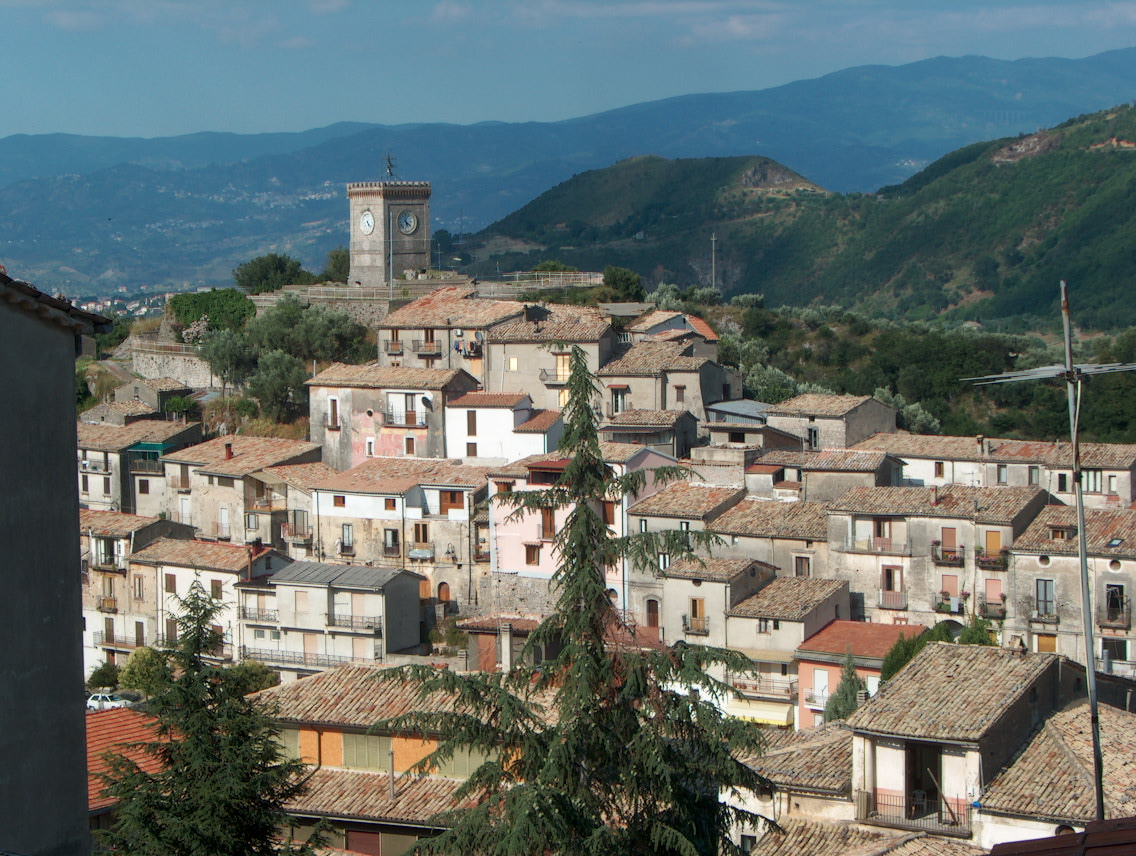

- Location within Italy Location within Calabria
- Coordinates: 39°16′N 16°12′E
- Country: Italy
- Region: Calabria
- Province: Cosenza (CS)
- Frazioni: Candelisi, Cappelli, Malaugello, Palagani, Pasquali (o Santa Croce), Ponte di Carolei, Rizzuto, Rosario, San Bartolo, Santa Maria, Tivolille

Government
  - Mayor: Irma Bucarelli (Orizzonte Mendicino)

Area
  - Total: 35.69 km^{2} (13.78 sq mi)
- Elevation: 500 m (1,600 ft)

Population (31 October 2017)
  - Total: 9,491
  - Density: 265.9/km^{2} (688.8/sq mi)
- Demonym: Mendicinesi
- Time zone: UTC+1 (CET)
  - Summer (DST): UTC+2 (CEST)
- Postal code: 87040
- Dialing code: 0984
- Patron saint: Saint Nicholas
- Website: Official website

Mendicino (Calabrian: Mennicìnu) is a city and comune in the province of Cosenza, Calabria, in Southern Italy.

== Notable people ==
- Egor Tropeano (born 1992), winter swimmer and coach
