= Swimrun =

Sports competition with running and swimming

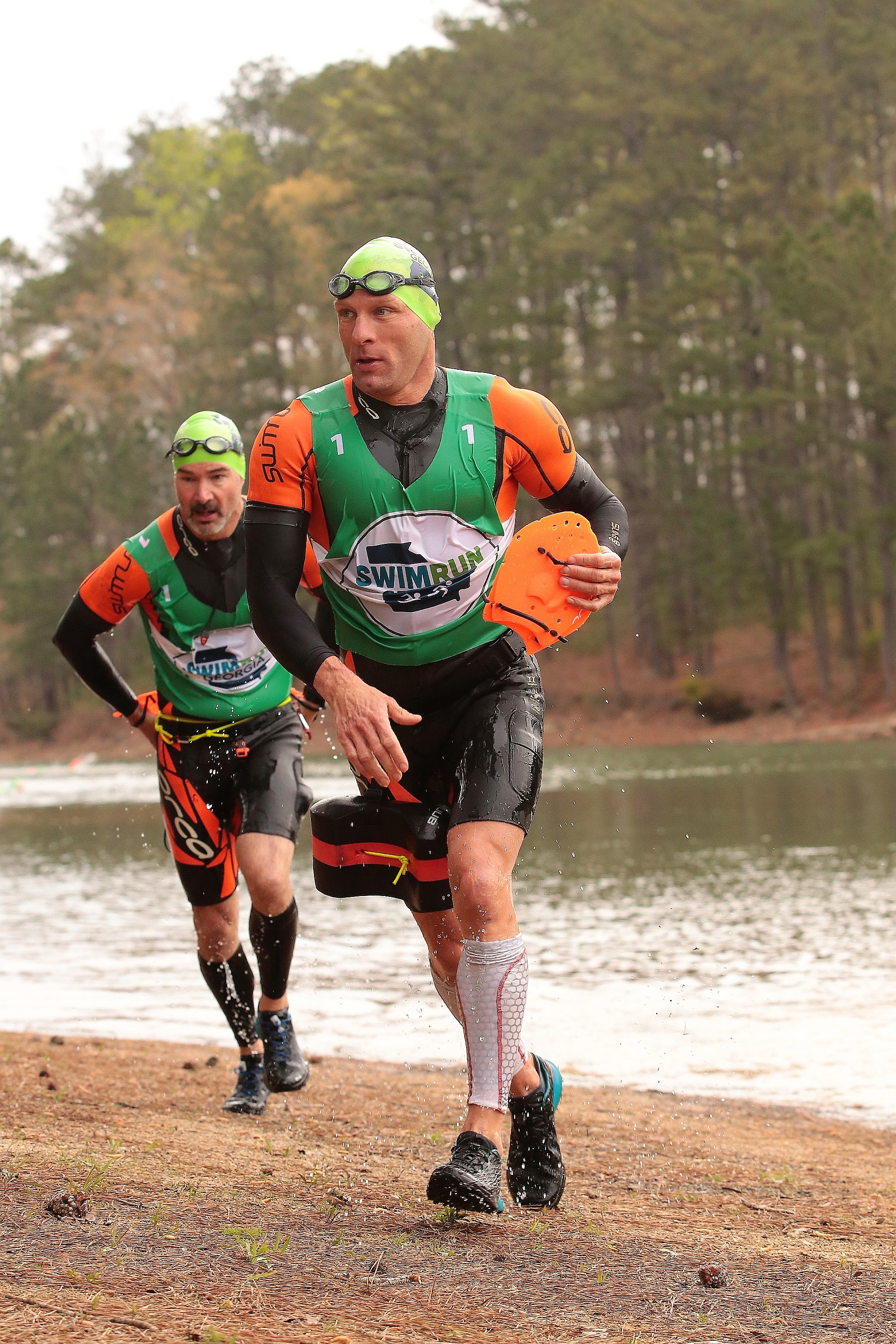
- The transition from swimming to running
- Highest governing body: WT - World Triathlon Federation from 2025 WSRF World Swimrun Federation - Switzerland constitutional meeting: Italy- Centro Educazione sportiva / France - Fédération Française de Triathlon / Finland - Suomen Triathlonliitto ry
- Nicknames: CSEN / FFTRI / FITRI
- First played: September 2, 2006 in Sweden – Solo August 2014 in Italy

Characteristics
- Mixed-sex: Two (two males, two women, or mixed team), Solo (one man or one woman)
- Type: Endurance sport, open water. Running (typically trail or off trail)
- Equipment: Pull buoy, swim paddles, shoes, wetsuit, tether, pressure bandage, whistles (1 per person), and foldable cups/flasks.

Presence
- Country or region: Originated in Sweden, but races have been starting from 2014 in others European Countries (Italy, Switzerland and Norway), from 2015 rest of Europe, Australia, America and Asia
- Olympic: No
- Paralympic: No

A swimrun is a multiple-stage competition which involves participants running and swimming over a racecourse that involves multiple swim and run stages. Typically, participants do not change clothing in transitions as in other multi-sports such as triathlon. All equipment used by participants has to be carried all the way to the finish line.

== History ==
The first swimrun race was the Swedish Ö till ö (stylized as ÖtillÖ), a 75-kilometre (47 mi) course across 26 islands. In 2002, Anders Malm, the owner of Utö Värdshus (the finish line hotel of ÖtillÖ), his friend Janne Lindberg and some of his staff (the Andersson brothers) had a late night in the bar. They challenged each other – "Last team of two to Sandhamn pays for hotel, dinner and drinks". Thetwo teams started the next morning with the only rule being that they had to pass the three different restaurants on the islands between the start and the finish. The last team at the restaurant had to drink and pay what the team ahead of them had ordered for them. It took them more than 24 hours and they were too tired to party on arrival. They tried again the year after with the same result. They're referred to as Original 4.

In 2006, Michael Lemmel and Mats Skott were asked if they could make a commercial race out of their challenge. The first couple of years, only 11 teams started and only two teams managed to finish within the time limits. They were: Petri Forsman, Ville Niemelä and Johan Hasselmark, Martin Sahlen. Then the teams learned that the only way to race is by not stopping, with constant movement. Unlike the original course set by the creators, Utö became the finish line while Sandhamn became the start. The race became known as ÖtillÖ (Island to island), Today the race is internationally recognized as the Swimrun World Championship for ÖtillÖ and has been ranked by CNN as one of the toughest races in the World. It was also later mentioned by one article as one of the toughest 1-day endurance races in the world, and is currently the standard when it comes to rules and style of racing.

In 2011 the style of racing picked up the name "swimrun", given by Erika Rosenbaum, one of the ÖtillÖ Swimrun World Championship podium finishers. Sometimes stylized as "SwimRun", most common usage is "swimrun" or "Swimrun".

In 2014 on August 3, the first swimrun race done in warm water, as an individual event and not a standard dual-team race. The biggest different between Aquaticrunner and the Nordic races are two: the Individual/Solo race (no team) and that swimming tools are not permitted (no fins, snorkel, etc.) with the exception that a pull buoy is allowed (Paddle starting from 2017). The Other races done outside of Sweden in 2014 was: Rockman Swimrun and XTERRA Swimrun (stapped in 2016) both in Norway, Engandina in Switzerland and Amphibianman in Italy (this was the first outside of Sweden done on May 10, 2014). Aquaticrunner 2014 was also the first Individual/Solo Swimrun done in the world and it was realized by Matteo Benedetti.

In 2014, the organisation World of Swimrun (WoS) was formed as a neutral, independent and global non-profit organisation, with a mission to bring swimrun to everybody. World of Swimrun also hosts the biggest data source on available and active races in the world.

In 2015, the world's first Ultraswimrun, the Stockholm Archipelago Ultra Challenge (SAUC) took place, and is considered the current (2019) toughest available swimrun race challenge in the world, stretching over some 250 km. SAUC is also the official Ultraswimrun open challenge. In 2015 the swimrun started in Russia with Individual and Team forums.

In 2015, the World Swimrun Federation was founded in Switzerland Constitutional meeting (Canton Ticino Switzerland - official language: Italian). The objective of WSRF is to discipline, organize, promote, advance and spread out the sport of Swimrun throughout the wide world in Individual/solo and Team formula. The scope is to promote and develop swimrun sport in the world in accordance with the principles set out by the Olympic Charter and in protection of physical and mental health of athletes, fighting doping in all its forms. The organisation is independent and global non-profit.

In 2016, Swimrun Australia became the first swimrun not only in Australia but also the southern hemisphere, bathing the way for the growth of swimrun in the Asia-Pacific region . Most swimrun races are completed in teams of two. Starting from 2016, there are some individual/solo swimrun in the world: starting from Italy (Italian Swimrun series 12 race swimrun italy), now 17 race, Love Swimrun, Canarie Swimrun and Portugal Swimrun, in Individual and Team forums.

In 2017, In France, swimrun is linked to the FFTRi, as it is in Finland. Others individual/solo swimrun on 2017 was Canada Canaqua Swimrun and Uruguay Swimrun. In Africa, Torpedo Swimrun held the first swimrun race on the continent in Cape Town on January 15, 2017. The race covers 16 km of Cape Town coastline, with swims in the South Atlantic and running at the base of Table Mountain. In Japan, Kaiyo Swimrun held the first swimrun race in Asia on May 27, 2017.

In 2018, the world's first book on swimrun was published Swimrun – The Guide to Swimrun Training & Racing, Stockholm, Sweden (2018).In 2018 Aquaticrunner was the first individual World Championship with 22 nations represented and 250 athletes qualified. The world qualified was done in Fuerteventura, Madeira, Canada, Russa, Uruguay, Belgin, and Italy. In Japan, a new swimrun race, called Marunuma Swimrun was held which contained regular and sprint distance.

The international focus has been growing in the last years, and on December 28, 2018, there are more than 500 known races in the world, in 24 countries and on 5 continents.

In 2018, Ultra Swimrun ALPS consisted of a 127 kilometres (79 mi) run, 4,500 metres (14,800 ft) swim D+, passing through to the alpine lakes and is the swimrun race with the maximum total elevation. Swimrun debuted on March 30, 2019 in Brazil, and became the first in tropical countries. Búzios Swimrun changed to Hero Swimrun in honor of the effort of the athletes. With 200 athletes, the distances were 10 kilometres (6.2 mi) (solo / teams) and 24 kilometres (15 mi) (teams) in 7 different terrains and 17 beaches. The event also carried out environmental actions before the race, collecting 100 kilograms (220 lb) of garbage in partnership with the Swedish Embassy in Brazil and with the local government.

In 2019, Swimrun U.S. Series Ignite Swimrun became the first Swimrun series in the United States of America with 5 races using the individual/solo formula. Aquaticrunner was the second individual W.C. with 19 nations represented.

In 2020, during the COVID-19 pandemic, some races were held anyway. Otillo Engadin was done, Aquaticrunner was the Italian Championship and Fuerteventura Swimrun assigned the World Cup in Half Category, but 80% of the races were canceled.

In 2021, 2022 and 2023 ÖtillO, The Swimrun World Championship was done with many qualifications. Aquaticrunner was the third Solo World Championship with more than 20 nations represented and 240 athletes qualified in many countries (Fuerteventura, Madeira, Uruguay, Hungary, Belgium and Italy).

On October 8th, 2025, in Wollongong (Australia), during the XXXVIII Congress, the Swimrun activity was added on the World Triathlon Federation, with Individual and Team events.

In 2026 (Jan 17th), in Italy, swimrun is linked to the FiTRi.

== Swimrun characteristics ==
What defines a swimrun is that it's always carried out outdoors and in water where the goal is to go from a starting point to a finish point through a course with at least two swim and two run sections. All the equipment that a participant starts with has to be carried all the way to the finish line, meaning swimming needs to be done with shoes. Even though swimrun urges participants to use flotation equipment, equipment larger than 100×60 cm is not allowed. Swimming with shoes makes the kick fairly inefficient and breaststroke not so suitable. The flotation equipment keeps the legs at surface meaning a good crawl position can be maintained without kick.

Because of safety measures a swimrun competition is usually carried out by teams but there are several races where you can race individually. There are three classes to compete in; either a men's class, women's class or a mixed gender class.

Given that swimrun takes place outside in natural surroundings, there are no standards in terms of how far the total run and swim should be. There is also no rule on the ratio between the swim and run distances. There is also no set minimal or maximal distance of the individual swim or run segments. Swimrun organisers are free to select suitable area's similar to cross-country races in running.

Swimrun organisors typically mention at least the total swim and run distance of their races so participants know if the event suits them. Most organisors also provide details on the length of all individual run and swim segments for participants' further preparation. To give participants a quicker insight into a swimrun event's characteristics some organisors also provide an overview of the number of swim and run segments and then just the length of the longest run segment and longest swim segment. Any altitude covered during runs is also mentioned.

The Swimrun Book by Niklas Karlson does specify that a swimrun should be 'carrying at least two swim and run sections'. This implies a minimum of three transitions which distinguishes swimrun from otherwise similar sports like aquathlon, biathle. These only have a single swim and one or two transitions.

Another difference is that in swimrun all equipment shall be carried all the way from start to finish. While aquathlon — like triathlon — has a transition area with a spot for each participant to get their shoes and run clothes and leave a wetsuit or other swimming gear.

== Distances ==
The race levels vary in the world. There are no set race limits or race standards apart from having to compete in twos and as to what is constituted as a swimrun race. Currently the majority of races (2018) are spread among the following levels below (1st table).

The world standard swimrun distances are divided into 6 types, in accordance with the majority of available races including ÖtillÖ.

Standard swimrun distances - 2006–2018
| Level | Race distance |
|---|---|
| Super Sprint | <=10 km |
| Sprint | >10.1 & <=20 km |
| Regular | > 20.1 & <=40 km |
| Long | >40.1 & <=75 km |
| Ultra | +75 km |
| Multiday | >24 hours |

In Italy foremost, and few other European countries, a different distance scheme is used.

Individual swimrun distances - 2014–2018
| Level | From | To | Race distance |
|---|---|---|---|
| Short | 1/4/4 | 2/7/n | <=5k |
| Basic | 2/8/4 | 3/11/n | > 5.1 & <=10k |
| Half | 4/17/8 | 7/29/n | > 10.1 & <=21k |
| Full | 8/34/14 | 12/35/n | > 21.1 & <=42k |
| Long | 8/34/14 | 12/35/n | > 42.1 & <=75k |
| Ultra | 10/65/20 | No limits | >=75.1k |

In France in 2017, the FFTri, defined the national standard distances.

France classification distance since 2017
| Level | From | To |
|---|---|---|
| Distance XS | | <5k |
| Distance S | >5k | <12,5k |
| Distance M | >12,5k | <20k |
| Distance L | >20k | <35k |
| Distance XL | >35k | <55k |
| Distance XXL | >55k | No limits |

Considering that since 2018 many organizers propose both formula (team and individual), this is merge of the two distance table

Merge between team and individual distance since 2019
| Level | From | To | Race distance |
|---|---|---|---|
| Super Sprint | 1/4/4 | 2/8/n | <=10k |
| Sprint or Short | 2/8/6 | 4/17/n | > 10 & <=21k |
| Half | 4/17/8 | 8/34/n | > 21 & <=42k |
| Long | 8/34/10 | 10/65/n | > 42 & <=75k |
| Ultra | 10/65/20 | No limits | > 75k |
| multi-day | more than one day | No limits/4 | > 24 HOURS |

== The historical races 2006 - 2016 ==
| 2016 | 103 | 18 | +/-7000 | Sweden / Borensberg Swimrun, Sjö till Sjö, Utö (ötillö qualifier), Anglaloppet, Stockholm swimrun, Stockholm Archipelago Ultra Swimrun, Borås Swimrun, 50'turen 2 Sjöer, Infinity Swimrun 3h, Horfors Swimrun, Kustjageren, Vansbro, Höga Kusten (ötillö-qualifier), Årnes Swimrun, Kalmar Swimrun, Åstol Aquathlon, 2XU Island Challenge, Tylösand Aquathlon, Amfibiemannen, Wet rock race, Farleden, Farleden inomskärs, LED swimrun, Nordslingan Swimrun, Sjö till Sjö, Öloppet Swimrun, Skärgårdsutmaningen Swimrun, Karlstad Swimrun, Stockholm Archipelago Ultraswimrun Challenge, Karlskrona Swimrun, Marstrand Swimrun, Stora Stöten Swimrun, Idre Swimrun, Anglaloppet Swimrun, Moose2Goose Swimrun, 10 Island Race, Sigge tuna Swimrun, ÖtillÖ Swimrun World Championship, Arlanda Swimrun, Tjolöholm Swimrun, Koster Swimrun, Lilla Astol Swimrun, Langholmen Swimrun, Sollentuna Swimrun, Snapphanen, GBG Swimrun, Hellas frostbite; Italy / Amphibianman (Aquaticrunner qualifier), Conero Swimrun (Aquaticrunner qualifier), Elba Swimrun (Aquaticrunner qualifier), Idro Swimrun (Aquaticrunner qualifier), Swimrun Venice (Aquaticrunner qualifier), Umbria Swimrun (Aquaticrunner qualifier), Bologna Swimrun (Aquaticrunner qualifier), 2° Anfibia Swimrun, 3° Aquaticrunner ITALY XTriM Border Lagoon; Switzerland / Engadin (ötillö-qualifier); Norway / Swimrun Norway - To the worlds end, Oslofjorden Sprint Swimrun, Rockman; Germany / Paddle to the Medal, Rheinsberg, Allgaeu Swimrun, 1000 Lakes Swimrun (ötillö qualifier); England / Breca Buttermere, Isle of Scilly (ötillö-qualifier), The Broards Swimrun; Wales / Love Swimrun Llanberis, Snowdonia Lyn I Lyn; Scotland / Loch Lomond Inch by Inch Swimrun, Hell's Hop, Loch gu loch; Ireland / Breca Arranmore; Denmark / XTERRA Swimrun Denmark, Urban Swimrun (swimrun cup Denmark), Beach Swimrun (swimrun cup Denmark), Bornholm Swimrun, Lake Swimrun (swimrun cup Denmark), DGI Swimrun Rødekro; Belgium / Amphimann, Amphiman De Schorre; Finland / Midnightsun Swimrun, Porkkala Swimrun, Solvalla Swimrun (ötillö-qualifier); Russia / Lake-to-Lake; France / Saint quentin Swimrun, Emeraude Swimrun; United States / Casco Bay Islands Swimrun, Swimrun North Carolina, Swimrun Virginia, Mission Bay Swimrun; Spain / Costa Brava Swimrun; Canada / Mushoka's Epic Swimrun; Armenia / Sevan Lake Swimrun; Ireland / Breca Árainn Mhóre Swimrun, Galway Bay Swimrun; South Africa / Torpedo Swimrun Cape Town; Australia / Australia Swimrun, |
| 2015 | 55 | 12 (counting England and Scotland as different countries, otherwise 11 nations) | 6441 | Sweden Ö till Ö, 4th Lake Swimrun*, 10 Island Swimrun, Amfibiemannen , Ångaloppet , Ångaloppet Sprint, Stockholm Archipelago UltraSwimrun Challenge Arlanda Aquathlon, Årnäs Swimrun, Borås Swimrun , Borås Swimrun Sprint, Borensberg Swimrun, Farleden, Farleden inomskärs, Hofors Swimrun , Höga Kusten Swimrun, Idre Swimrun, Karlstad Swimrun, Koster Swimrun, Kustjagaren, Långholmen Swimrun, Loftahammar Endurance Day, Lyckans Swimrun, Marstrand Open Water, Marstrand Open Water Sprint, Nordslingan, Öloppet, Öloppet Sprint, Sigge Tuna Swimrun, Sjö till Sjö Växjö, Sjö till Sjö Sala, Skärgårdsutmaningen, Skärgårdsutmaningen Sprint, Stockholm Swimrun, Snapphanen Swimrun, Solvalla Swimrun*, Stora Stöten Swimrun, Utö Swimrun, Vansbro Swimrun, WetRockRace Italy 2° Amphibianman Swimrun 2° Aquaticrunner XTriM Swimrun, 1° Tnatura Anfibia Swimrun Switzerland Engadin Swimrun Norway Swimrun Norway - To the worlds end, Oslofjorden Sprint Swimrun, Rockman Germany Paddle to the Meda England Breca Swimrun Scotland Loch Lomond Swimrun, Loch Gu Loch Swimrun Denmark XTERRA Swimrun Denmark Belgium Amphiman, Amphiman Sprint Finland Porkkala Swimrun Russia Lake-to-Lake Russia France Émeraude Swimrun, Swimrun Saint-Quentin, Troll Enez Morbihan |
| 2014 | 22 | 4 | 3574 | Sweden Ö till Ö, 10 Island Swimrun, Amfibiemannen, Ångaloppet, Ångaloppet Sprint, Arlanda Aquathlon, Borås Swimrun, Farleden, Farleden inomskärs, Karlstad Swimrun, Kustjagaren Karlskrona, Loftahammar Endurance Day, Öloppet, Öloppet Sprint, Utö Swimrun, Skärgårdsutmaningen, Skärgårdsutmaningen Sprint, Solvalla Swimrun, Stockholm Swimrun Italy 1° Amphibianman Swimrun 1° Aquaticrunner XTriM Swimrun, Switzerland Engadin Swimrun Norway XTERRA Swimrun, Rockman Swimrun |
| 2013 | 10 | 1 | 1948 | Sweden Ö till Ö, Arlanda Aquathlon, Amfibiemannen, Ångaloppet, Ångaloppet Sprint, Kustjagaren Karlskrona, Öloppet, Öloppet Sprint, Utö Swimrun, WetRockRace |
| 2012 | 5 | 1 | 900 | Sweden Ö till Ö, Amfibiemannen, Ångaloppet, Öloppet, WetRockRace |
| 2011 | 3 | 1 | 196 | Sweden Ö till Ö, Ångaloppet, WetRockRace |
| 2010 | 1 | 1 | 16 | Sweden Ö till Ö |
| 2009 | 1 | 1 | 16 | Sweden Ö till Ö |
| 2008 | 1 | 1 | 6 | Sweden Ö till Ö |
| 2007 | 1 | 1 | 4 | Sweden Ö till Ö |
| 2006 | 1 | 1 | 4 | Sweden Ö till Ö |
