= Ice mile =

Ice mile is a swimming term and is defined as British Mile, swimming in water with a temperature of 5.0 °C (41.0 °F) or lower, under IISA Swimming Rules and Regulations.

== Rules ==
The International Ice Swimming Association defines rules for swimming within these conditions.

== Records ==
The International Ice Swimming Association maintains records.
