= Alanya Triathlon =

Triathlon competition in Turkey

- Host: Alanya, Antalya
- Country: Turkey
- Organizer: Turkish Triathlon Federation
- Nations: 27 (2022); 23 (2023); 26 (2024); 34 (2025)
- Athletes: 600 (2022); 232 (2023); 367 (2024); 242 (2025)
- Sports: Triathlon (swimming, biking, running)
- Dates: October
- Race length: Swimming: 750 m (2,460 ft); Biking: 20 km (12 mi); Running: 5 km (3.1 mi)

Location of the Alanya Triathlon

The Alanya Triathlon is an annual internationai triathlon competition established in 1992 and held in Alanya District of Antalya, Turkey. It is one of the European Triathlon Cup legs.

== Overview ==
Organized by the Turkish Triathlon Federation in cooperation with the local district municipality, the event was held for the first time on 1 July 1992, as the "International Alanya Triathlon" (Turkish: Uluslararası Alanya Triatlonu). The competition is carried out in Alanya District of Antalya, southwestern Turkey scheduled in every October. The competition became part of the European Triathlon Cup.

The event starts at Galip Dede Beach with swimming at a distance of 750 m (2,460 ft), and continues with 20 km (12 mi) biking and 5 km (3.1 mi) running. In the public triathlon race, organized to encourage citizens to participate in sports, athletes compete in shortened distances like the 250 m (820 ft) swimming, 5 km (3.1 mi) biking and 1.2 km (0.75 mi) running stages. Male and female triathletes for the public event are categorized in five-year age groups between 20 and 79.

== History ==
In the 30th edition in 2021, mixed relay event was introduced, where a world record of 34 teams competed. The Hungarian team (Romina Nadas, Zolin Hobor, Lili Dobi, Kolos Trungel-Nagy) became the winner before the Italian and Russian teams. At the 2022 European Triathlon Cup Alanya, 600 triathletes from 27 nations competed. The number of athletes were 232 from 23 nations in 2023, 367 from 26 nations in 2024, and 242 from 34 nations in 2025.

== Winners ==
| Year | Athlete | Time | Ref. |
Elite men
| 2022 | (Switzerland) Adrien Briffod | 53:01 | |
| 2023 | (France) Nathan Grayel | 52:26 | |
| 2024 | (France) Thomas Hansmaennel | 50:58 | |
| 2025 | (France) Louis Vitiello | 47:58 | |
Elite women
| 2022 | (Germany) Lisa Tersch | 59:16 | |
| 2023 | (Germany) Julia Bröcker | 58:43 | |
| 2024 | (Germany) Julia Bröcker | 56:38 | |
| 2025 | (France) Manon Laporte | 54:09 | |
