= Indoor triathlon =

Sporting event

An indoor triathlon is a nonstandard variation of the triathlon and consists of three events: swimming, cycling, and running. The swim is held in an indoor pool, the cycling takes place on stationary bikes, and the run takes place on an indoor track or treadmill. Indoor triathlons are generally held in fitness clubs to accommodate all three sports.

In some competitions participants are judged by the distance they travel in each event in a set amount of time. Times can vary between races. On other occasions, the triathlon is conducted in the same manner as an outdoor triathlon in that distances are set and participants compete to finish the total distance in the shortest amount of time. Generally, the swimming is the shortest event, and cycling is the longest. Occasionally, transition time will not be factored into the overall scoring. In one example, participants are given about 5 minutes to transition between events.

An indoor triathlon has several advantages when compared to an outdoor triathlon. Indoor triathlons are a way to compete during the winter, as well as a way to be introduced to the sport without facing an open water swim.

== Gallery ==
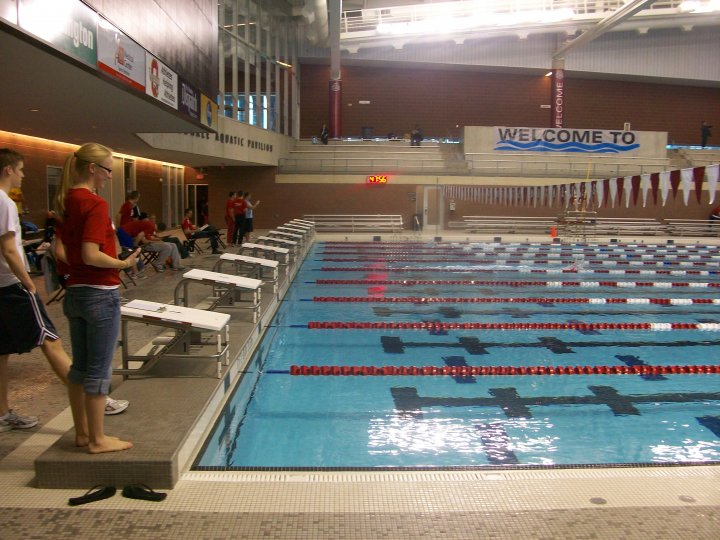
The swimming portion of an indoor triathlon.

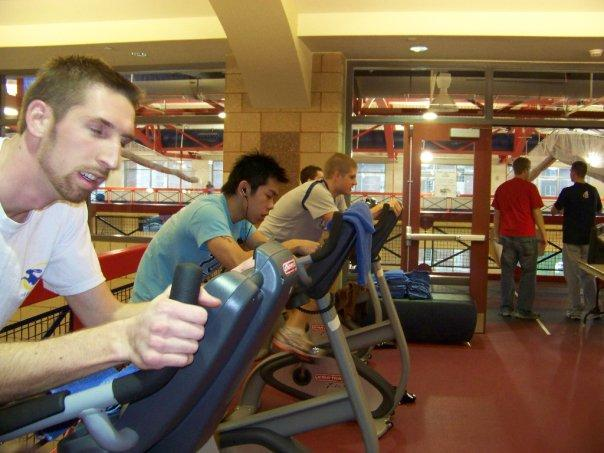
The cycling portion of an indoor triathlon.

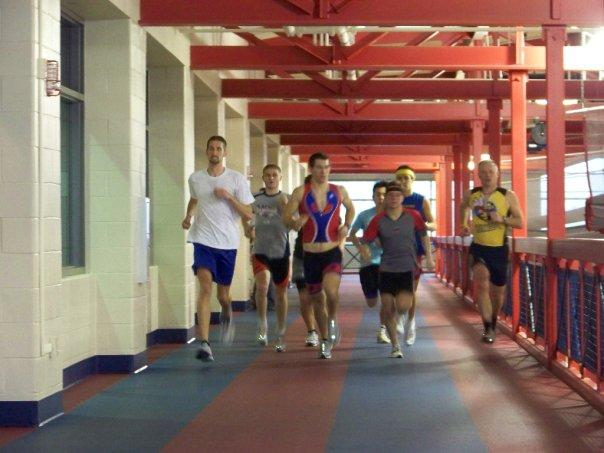
The running portion of an indoor triathlon.
