= Winter Swimming World Championships =

International winter swimming competition

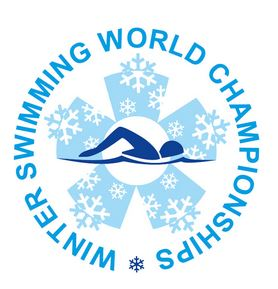
logo Winter Swimming World Championships (IWSA)

Winter Swimming World Championships (WSWC) is masters championships in the men's and women's age categories (A to J2) organized by International Winter Swimming Association (IWSA) which was founded in 2006 after great success and huge international attendance at the 2006 Finnish Winter Swimming Championships in Oulu. They have been held at biennial intervals in various locations since the year 2000 and follow the IWSA winter swimming rules.

== Overview ==
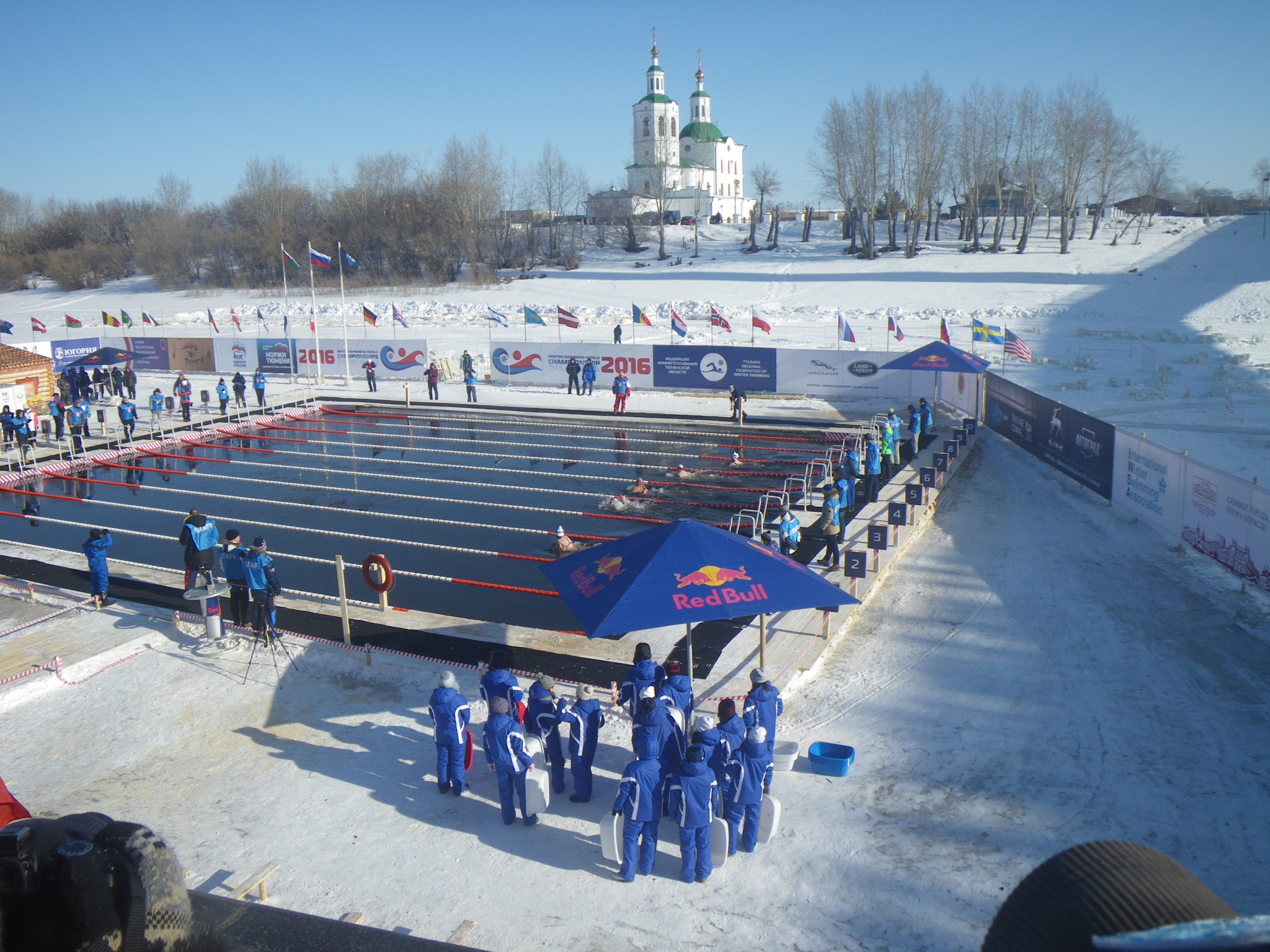
2016 Winter Swimming World Championships

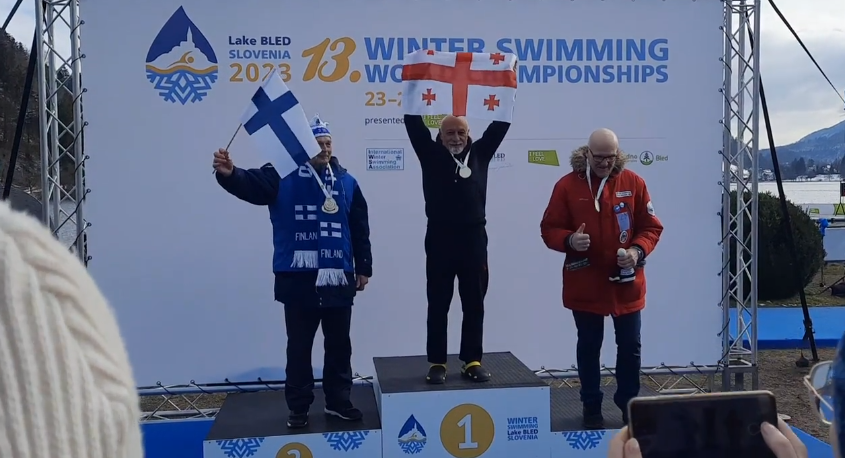
2023 Winter Swimming World Championships

Year	#	Country	Municipality	Date	Notices
2000	1.	Finland	Helsinki		About 500 participants, it is considered to be the first WSWC
2001	2.	Finland	Jyväskylä		About 750 participants
2002	3.	Finland	Kajaani		About 650 participants
2004	4.	Finland	Muonio		About 300 participants, the prevailing style is still "head-up breaststroke"
2006	5.	Finland	Oulu		Swimming in the river, 1st major international winter swimming event, 980 people
2008	6.	United Kingdom	London		680 people, for the first time endurance swimming competition 450 m
2010	7.	Slovenia	Bled		790 persons, 450 m for the first time in open water
2012	8.	Latvia	Jurmala	20–22 January	1129 participants
2014	9.	Finland	Rovaniemi	20–23 March	1244 participants
2016	10.	Russia	Tyumen	8–10 March	1275 participants, strong competition
2018	11.	Estonia	Tallinn	6–10 March	1386 persons, swimming pool in sea port, water 0 °C, + butterfly style
2020	12.	Slovenia	Bled	3–9 February	1042 persons, for the first time also a 1000 m competition (in the lake)
2023	13.	Slovenia	Bled		890 participants
2024	14.	Estonia	Tallinn		1405 participants
2026	15.	Finland	Oulu	2–8 March
2028	16.	Argentina	El Calafate

The planned venue for the WSWC 2022 Championship is Lake Onega near the town of Petrozavodsk in the Republic of Karelia in Russia, on 21 to 27 March 2022. And in following references are additional facts concerning WSWC 2020 in Bled.
