= Lago di Cavazzo =

Lake in Northern Italy

Lake Cavazzo
- Lago di Cavazzo (Italian)
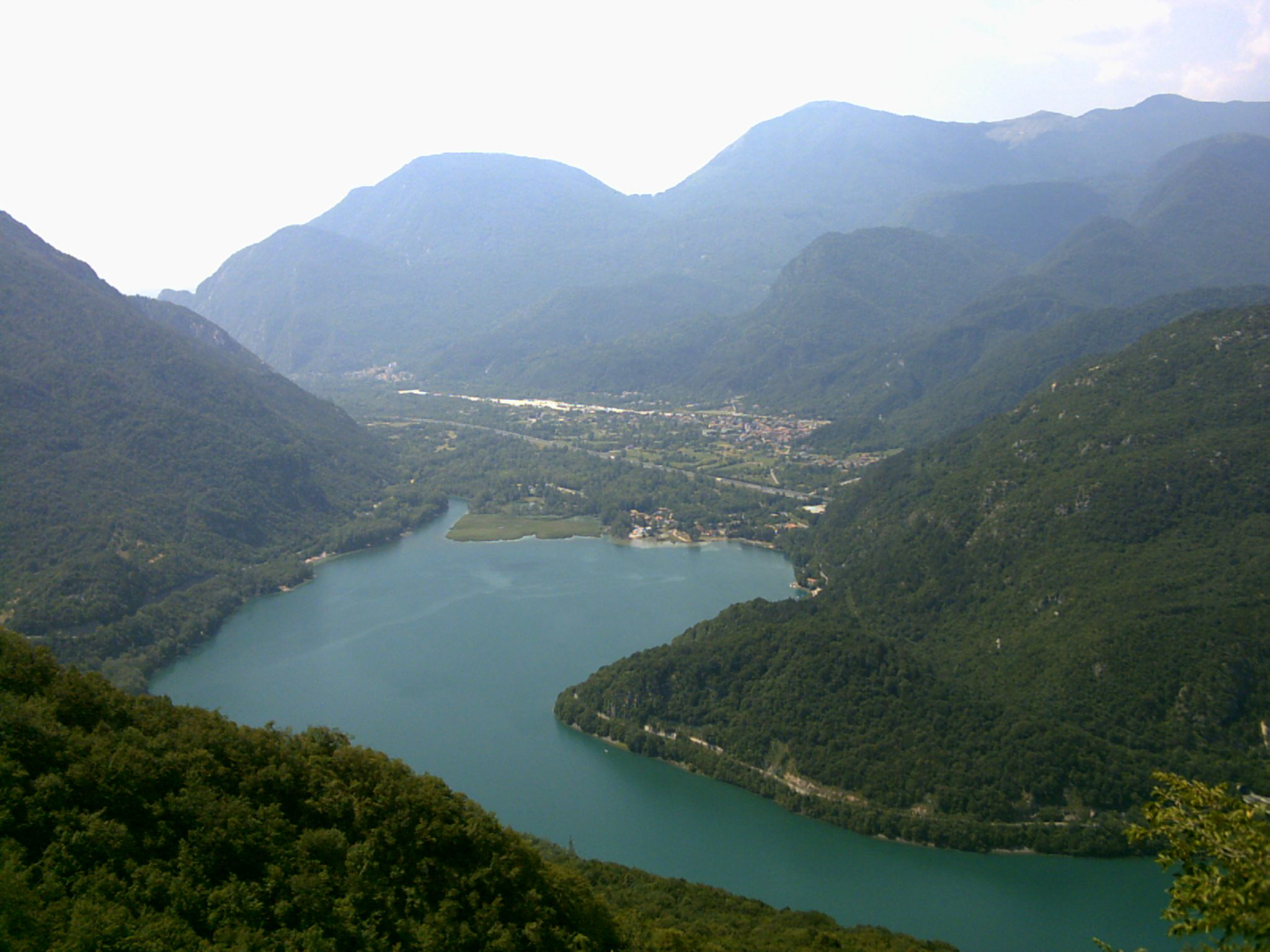

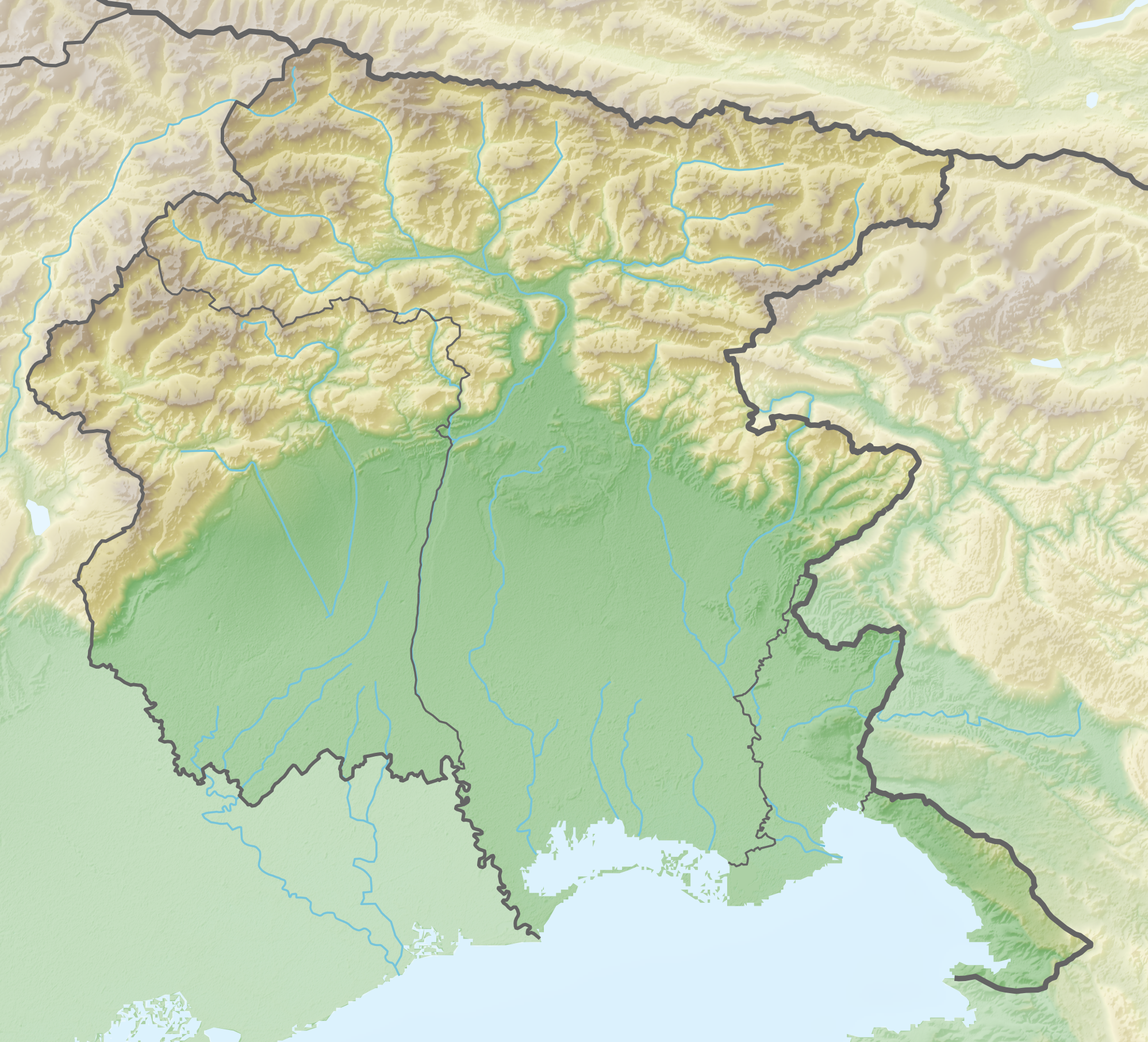
- Location within Friuli-Venezia Giulia
- Location: Province of Udine, Friuli-Venezia Giulia
- Coordinates: 46°19′42″N 13°4′21″E
- Basin countries: Italy
- Surface area: 1.74 km^{2} (0.67 sq mi)
- Surface elevation: 191 m (627 ft)
- Settlements: Cavazzo Carnico, Trasaghis

Lago di Cavazzo (Friulian: Lât di Cjavaç) is the largest natural lake in the Province of Udine, Friuli-Venezia Giulia, Italy. At an elevation of 191 m, its surface area is 1.74 km².

== Geography ==
The lake is situated in the territory of the municipality of Cavazzo Carnico, in the north-east of Italy. Lake Cavazzo is of glacial origin and it is 2,250 m long, 400 to 800 m wide, has a maximum depth of about 40 m; its surface area is 1.2 km² and its perimeter is 7.6 km.

== Flora and fauna ==
A vast reedbed occupies part of the south shore and is an ideal breeding habitat for various native fish species such as pike, tench, perch and more. There are also different species of birds, such as common mallard and kingfisher, which are visible as you walk along the path that borders the lake. All along the shores of the lake birdwatchers can find observation towers positioned at strategic points. The valley is renowned for the presence of numerous species of butterflies and it is possible to visit the House of Butterflies in Bordano to discover lepidopterans and other insects from all over the world.

The campsite is also an excellent starting point for those who want to hike the trails in the forests of the Carnic Prealps. A short distance away you can also find the Lake Cornico Nature Reserve, the natural habitat of griffon vultures.
