= Winter triathlon =

Sport variant of triathlon

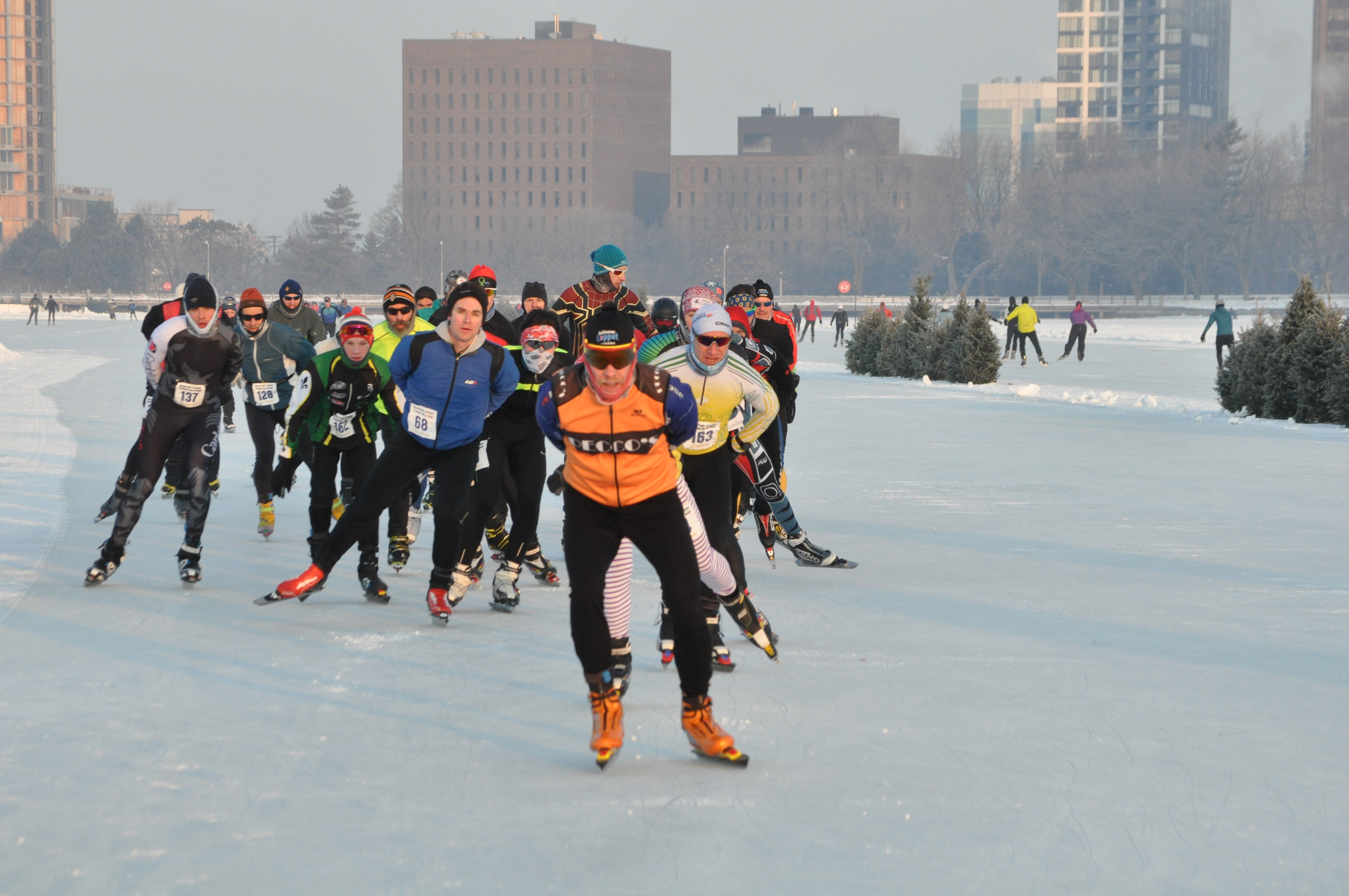
Triathletes skating during the 2020 Winterlude Triathlon in Ottawa, Ontario.

Winter triathlon is a multisport event involving the continuous and sequential completion of speed skating, cross-country skiing and snowshoeing or running, or mountain biking, all on snow. Course distances are set on the day of the event to achieve a winning time around 80–90 minutes, after taking account of the snow conditions.

Since 2013, the International Triathlon Union created a new version of the sport, which consists of 12 km of ice skating, 8 km of cross-country skiing and 5 km of snowshoeing. It is called winter triathlon S3, because the three sports start with an S (skate, ski, snowshoe). The first ITU event was held in Quebec, Canada in February 2015. However, the Canadian national winter triathlon championships have been running for over 30 years. The Winterlude Triathlon is the oldest established winter triathlon in Canada.

The sport was denied inclusion in the 2014 Winter Olympics in Sochi, Russia.
