= Quadrathlon =

Endurance sports event

A quadrathlon (or quadriathlon, tetrathlon) is an endurance sports event composed of four individual disciplines. All four disciplines are completed in succession and the lowest overall time decides the winner.

The World Quadrathlon Federation defines that a quadrathlon consists of

	Sprint Distance	Middle Distance	Long Distance
swimming	0.75 kilometers	1.5 km	4 km
cycling	20 km	40 km	100 km
kayaking	4 km	8 km	20 km
running	5 km	10 km	21 km

in any order, though usually as above.

The distances, time duration and events depending on the organizing body, the location of the event and the time of year. During the winter months, cross-country skiing and snowshoeing may replace swimming and kayaking.

In Great Britain, the governing body is the British Quadrathlon Association (BQA).

The World Quadrathlon Federation has stated aim is to provide and promote International awareness for the sport of Quadrathlon.

The event is extremely intense, and requires training before entering. People who have entered the event have commented on the strain it puts on the body after each interval, "My calves were so tight each step ricocheted through my body... By then I just wanted to be done" female competitor Domity Mcdowell wrote. The competitors that complete the Quadrathlon are usually also involved in events such as the triathlon, biathlons and marathons. Danelle Ballengee, a professional female athlete who has competed in multiple events claims she "just loves a challenge".

== World Cup ==
The World Quadrathlon Federation's World Cup has been running since 2001, and constitutes a series of races in multiple countries. The scoring method for the series takes the four best results for each athlete, awarding points based on position. Each athlete can enter as many races as they choose. This method allows participation for as large a number of people as possible, given the cup's geographic spread. The 2013 cup, which finished with the Bude Awesome Foursome, was won by Stefan Teichert in the men's category and Lisa Maria Hirschfelder in the women's, both of Germany.

The distribution of points per race decreases starting from 100 points. 1st-5th places are separated by 10 point increments, placings 5-11 are separated by 5 point increments, placements 11th-21st are separated by 2 point increments, from here the placement increments (21st-30th) are 1 point and any placements after that receive 0 points. International championship world cup races can be evaluated with more points that what was previously stated. Every place can be upgraded by 20 points, 1st place receives 120 instead of 100, 110 points instead of 90 for 2nd place, 21points instead of 1 point for 30th place. There are also bonus points for athletes who have finished more than four World Cup races in season. These athletes are awarded 10 points per every extra race completed.

== History ==
After failed attempts at beginning the quadrathlon in the early 80's, a man by the name of 'Prince' Sergio Ferrero initiated the first quadrathlon, held in 1987 on the island, Ibiza. This same man established the World Quadrathlon Federation (WQF) in 1990. This first quadrathlon consisted of a 5 km open water swim, 20 km open water kayak, 100 km bike and 25 km run. It was won by Philip Gabel from Australia in a time of just under 7 hours. The second edition in 1991 was won by Nigel Reynolds a dual citizen of Australia and South African who revolutionised the event by using a surf life-saving 'Ski' in the paddle section which dramatically improved the speed and course time. Not much has changed from the first quadrathlon up until now, as only 1 km has been reduced from the swim. In 1997, under the guidance of Czech Vaclav Marek, the European Quadrathlon Federation (EQF) was formed.

== European Championships ==
The 2013 European Championships was held in the UK in Lincolnshire and was won by Steve Clark from Great Britain and Lisa Maria Hirschfelder from Germany.

== Rules of the event ==
There are a number of rules and regulations that both the athletes and officials must follow on the day of the event. These rules, if not followed correctly can end in warnings, penalties and even disqualification. Some of the general guidelines that the athletes must abide by are as follows;

No outside assistance, No flippers or snorkels while swimming, No riding too close to the other cyclists, No private food or drink, The competitor may not block, charge or make an abrupt motion so as to interfere with the forward progress of another competitor and the competitor is not allowed to give or receive physical help from external factors.

General rules for each sport include:

=== Swim ===
There are not any specific rules for swimming in general, simply the attire worn by the swimmers. No fluorescent bathers to be worn and bathers must cover sexual characteristics. Swim goggles and caps are allowed and the identification number must be displayed on either the arm or back of the leg.

=== Bike ===
In the bike section of the race a bike must ride individually and have a support either on foot or in a separate vehicle. No biker can enter a transition area and must follow traffic rules if the course isn't closed to the public.

=== Kayak ===
The kayak must be ridden individually and non mechanical for any advantages. All kayaks/Canoes must be over 8 kg in weight.

=== Run ===
The upper body must be covered and footwear must be worn at all times, excluding shoes with spikes. No electronic devices can be used and any competitors leaving the race course for an advantage will be disqualified.

== Alternate versions ==
There has been other versions of quadrathlon. In 1984, in Australia, a version called "Fosters' Quadrathlon" included a 3-km swim, a 50-km race walk, a 160-km cycle ride, and a 42-km marathon.

In winter conditions, snowshoes and cross-country skiing usually replaces running and swimming.

== See also ==
- Biathlon
- Duathlon
- Triathlon
- Decathlon
- Swedish Classic Circuit
