= Ice bath =

Therapeutic body immersion in iced water

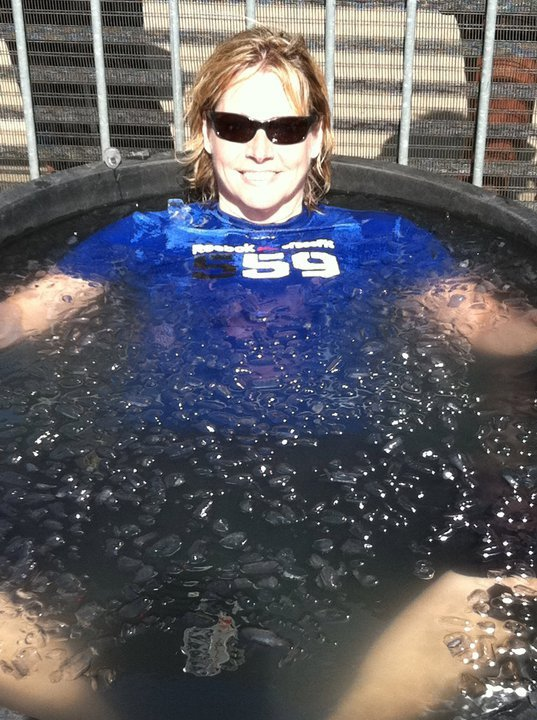
- Champion weightlifter Karyn Marshall taking an ice bath after the Crossfit Games in 2011
- Synonym(s): Cold water immersion (CWI), cold-water therapy
- Classification: Cryotherapy / Hydrotherapy
- Typical temperature: 50–59 °F (10–15 °C)
- Recommended duration: 10–15 minutes
- Primary uses: Sports recovery; Reduction of DOMS; Acute heat stroke treatment
- Physiological effects: Vasoconstriction; Decreased metabolic activity; Reduced local inflammation
- Risks: Hypothermia; Cold shock response; Cardiac stress

In sports therapy, an ice bath, or sometimes cold-water immersion, cold plunge or cold therapy, is a training regimen usually following a period of intense exercise in which a substantial part of a human body is immersed in a bath of ice or ice-water for a limited duration.

The method is controversial, with a risk of hypothermia, with the possibility of shock leading to sudden death. Many athletes have used cold water immersion after an intense exercise workout in the belief that it speeds up bodily recovery; however, the internal physical processes are not well understood and remain elusive.Evidence supporting cold water immersion as part of an athletic training has been mixed, with some studies suggesting a mild benefit such as reducing muscle damage and discomfort and alleviating delayed onset muscle soreness, with other studies suggesting that cold water immersion may slow muscle growth and interfere with an overall training regimen.

A 2025 Washington Post article cited research adding to growing scientific skepticism about the benefits of cold plunges particularly following strength training. Researchers found that immersing limbs in near-freezing water after weightlifting significantly reduced blood flow to the muscles, limiting their ability to absorb protein and recover. This effect could blunt muscle growth and undermine the benefits of resistance training. While cold plunges are often promoted for recovery and mental toughness, the new evidence suggests they may do more harm than good when used immediately after workouts.

== Techniques ==
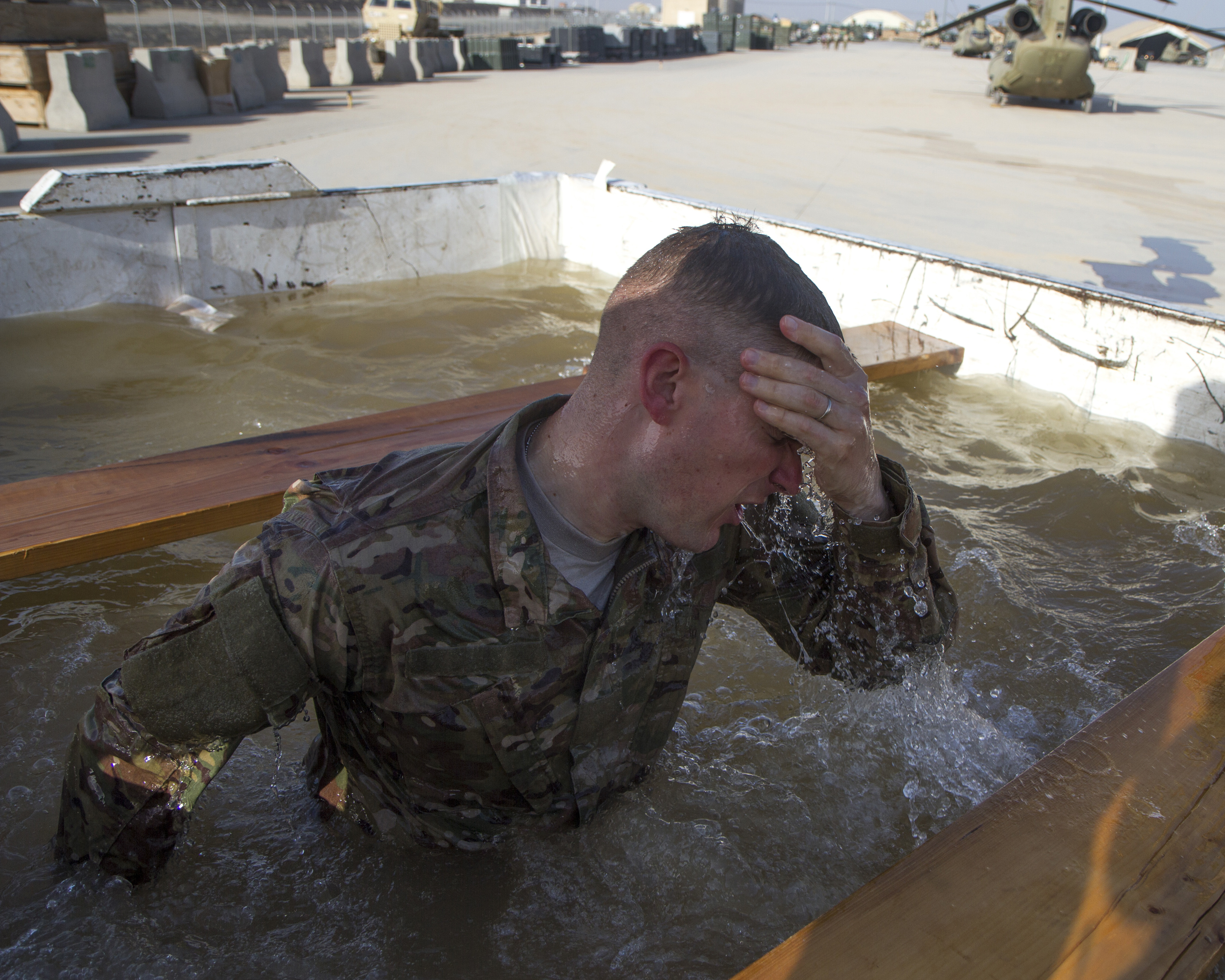
Ice baths have been used as a part of military training. (Mustang Mudder obstacle course May 5 at Kandahar Airfield, Afghanistan).

=== Bath ===
It is done by standing or sitting in a bucket or bath of icy water. One writer advised: "don't overdo it." Wearing rubberized "dive booties" on the feet (to protect toes) as well as rubber briefs to warm the midsection has been recommended. Champion weightlifter Karyn Marshall, who won the world women's weightlifting championship in 1987, described what it was like to take an ice bath after a day of competition at the CrossFit Games in 2011 in Los Angeles:

The first day I went in for twelve minutes, and the second day for fifteen minutes. They kept adding ice to keep the temperature at around 55 degrees (Fahrenheit) ... The hardest part was the first two minutes. Others who do it often told me to just hang in for two minutes and then it would be easier. After two minutes I was numb. Afterwards I was shivering for two hours in the hot California sun with a warm up jacket on.

— Karyn Marshall, 2011

One report suggested that if ice water is circulating, it is even colder such that the water will be colder than measured by a thermometer, and that athletes should avoid overexposure. Physical therapist Nikki Kimball explained a way to make the bath more endurable:

Over those years, I've discovered tricks to make the ice bath experience more tolerable. First, I fill my tub with two to three bags of crushed ice. Then I add cold water to a height that will cover me nearly to my waist when I sit in the tub. Before getting in, I put on a down jacket and a hat and neoprene booties, make myself a cup of hot tea, and collect some entertaining reading material to help the next 15 to 20 minutes pass quickly.

— Runner's World, 2008

=== Ice bath only versus contrast bath therapy ===
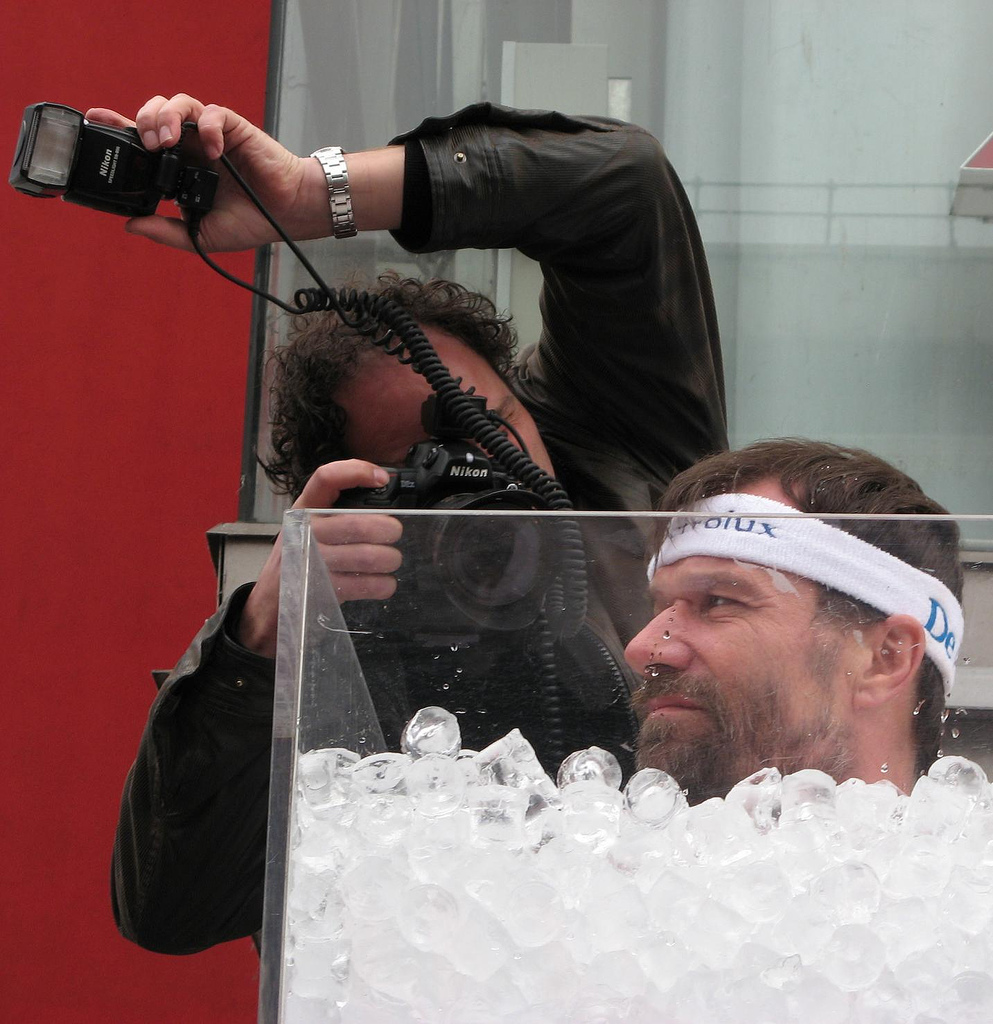
Iceman Wim Hof in an ice bath in 2007

Some athletes use a technique known as contrast water therapy or contrast bath therapy, in which cold water and warmer water are alternated. One method of doing this was to have two tubs––one cold (10–15 degrees Celsius) and another hot (37–40 degrees Celsius)––and to do one minute in the cold tub followed by two minutes in a hot tub, and to repeat this procedure three times.

=== Temperature and timing ===
The temperature can vary, but is usually in the range of 50–59 degrees Fahrenheit or between 10 and 15 degrees Celsius. Some athletes wear booties to keep their toes warm or rubberized coverings around their midsection while immersed. Some drink a warm beverage such as tea. One report suggested that "ten minutes immersed in 15 degree Celsius water" was sufficient.

Accounts vary about how long to be immersed and how often to do them. One adviser suggested that an athlete should take ten two-minute ice bath treatments over a two-week period. One account suggested immersion times should be between ten and twenty minutes. Another suggested that immersion run from five to ten minutes, and sometimes to twenty minutes. There were no sources advocating being immersed for longer than twenty minutes.

=== Ice baths versus cold baths ===
Several sources suggest that cold baths (60–75 °F, 16–24 °C) were preferable to ice baths. Physiotherapist Tony Wilson of the University of Southampton said that extremely cold temperatures were unnecessary and a "cold bath" would be just as effective as an ice bath. Another agreed that a mere cold bath is preferable to ice baths which are "unnecessary." A third report suggested that cool water (60–75 °F, 16–24 °C) was just as good as water at a lower temperature (54–60 °F, 12–16 °C) and that eight to ten minutes should be sufficient time, and warned against exceeding ten minutes.

== Effectiveness ==
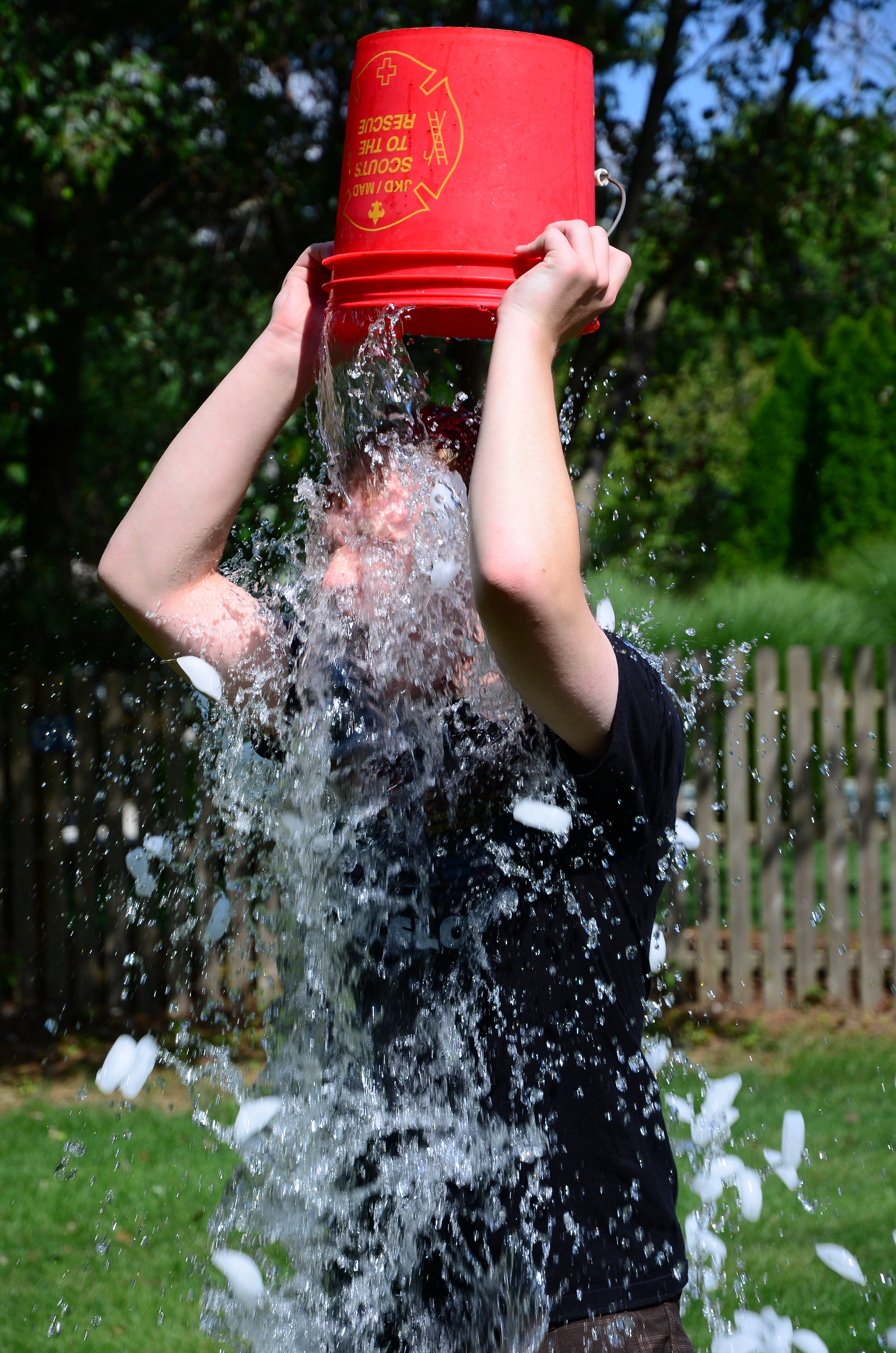
In summer 2014, the Ice Bucket Challenge went viral on social media to raise money for the ALS Association.

After exercise, there is some evidence that taking an ice bath may reduce delayed-onset muscle soreness and perceptions of fatigue, but no good evidence of any other benefit.

A 2024 meta-analysis of controlled trials concluded that cold water immersion immediately following resistance training may blunt the ensuing muscle hypertrophy. It was also observed that there was an apparent decline in the perception of stress within 12 hours post-exposure with improvements in sleep and quality of life scores. However, the authors cautioned that their conclusion was uncertain due to the relatively fair to poor quality of the underlying studies.

== Safety ==
There is agreement in the medical and scientific communities that ice baths can pose serious risks to health. Risks include hypothermia, shock and the possibility of sudden cardiac death.

== History ==
Marathon runner Paula Radcliffe won the 10,000m event at the 2002 European championships and attributed her victory to the use of ice baths. She reportedly said "It's absolute agony, and I dread it, but it allows my body to recover so much more quickly." She reported taking ice baths before racing and preferred her pre-race bath temperature to be "very cold." After the Radcliffe comment, the technique has grown in popularity. It is gaining in popularity among athletes, such that some athletes "swear by it" but other accounts suggest it may be a fad.

It has been used by athletes such as A. J. Soares and Olympic swimmer Michael Phelps as well as other celebrity endorsers and is getting to become "common practice" among athletes from different sports, including American football, association football (soccer), long distance running, rugby, tennis, volleyball, and other sports. There was a report that sports equipment manufacturers are considering different designs for ice baths. In the summer of 2014, as a fundraising method, the nonprofit ALS Association, which raises money for research and public awareness of amyotrophic lateral sclerosis (ALS), also known as Lou Gehrig's disease, began the Ice Bucket Challenge which involved donors filming themselves and challenging other donors to participate and then being doused with a bucket of ice cold water; as a fundraising effort, it raised $16 million over a 22-day period.

There are indications that ice baths may be gaining popularity with groups outside sports, such as dance. The Pittsburgh Post-Gazette reported that some Radio City Rockettes, a precision dance company performing in New York City, use ice baths after a long day of performing as a way to "unwind" and cope with "aches and pains." One report suggested that entertainer Madonna used ice baths after her performances. And there are indications that use of ice baths is spreading to amateur sports, such as high school football.

Explorer and athlete Fiann Paul is known for using ice baths as part of his training routine.

Ice baths are a part of a broader phenomenon known as cryotherapy—the Greek word cryo (κρυο) means cold—which describes a variety of treatments when cold temperatures are used therapeutically. Cryotherapy includes procedures where a person is placed in a room with "cold, dry air at temperatures as low as −135 °C" for short periods of time, and which has been used in hospitals in Poland as well as a center in London to treat not only muscular ailments, but psychological problems such as depression. Basketball player Manny Harris reportedly used a Cryon-X machine featuring extreme low temperatures around −166 °F (−110 °C), but used it with wet socks resulting in a serious freezer burn.

Occasionally ice baths have been an ill-advised treatment of fever in young children, but that doctors were counseled not to use this technique because of the risk of hypothermia. Ice baths have been suggested as a way to prevent muscle soreness after shoveling snow.

In addition, there have been instances of ice bathing as an extreme bodily test by persons vying for an endurance record, such as Dutch Iceman Wim Hof, and Chinese record-holders Chen Kecai and Jin Songhao. According to reports, doctors and scientists are studying how these people can spend an hour and a half submerged in an ice bath, and survive.

Ice baths began to become extremely popular after being discussed extensively by Joe Rogan and his universe of scientist and comedians such as Dr. Andrew Huberman (Stanford) and Aubury Marcus (Onnit).

A British woman died in 2022 due to an ice bath.

=== Ice bath vs. cryotherapy ===
Ice baths, an activity within the practice of cold therapy, has been predominately utilised for multiple decades for therapeutic purposes, typically for exercise recovery for athletes, and more recently for perceived mental health benefits, such as the alleviation of symptoms of mental health problems such as depression. Cryotherapy can be tracked "as far back as the Egyptians in 3000 BCE" as a wound treatment

Cryotherapy can be dated back to ancient Greece, its first mention in an ancient Egyptian medical text Edwin Smith Papyrus that is believed to date to around 3500 BCE, and furthermore through Hippocrates's theory of the four humours. Although, when applying a historical perspective, cold-water immersion was used first as a form of socialisation and relaxation, before its physiological and psychological benefits were noted.

The main medical treatments that Ancient Greeks employed the use of cold-water immersion for were fever, as the cold was thought to counteract the body's heat, and for pain relief. The use of cold-water immersion for medical treatments for physiological symptoms continued until the late 1950s. In fact, it was not utilised for post-exercise recovery until the 1960s, by D H Clarke. However, the use of cold-water immersion for post-exercise recovery and treatment is by far the most popular and well-known use of the technique, despite being the most recent.

The organizers of the 2024 Olympic Games in Paris ordered around 650 tonnes of ice to be used for ice therapy at the Olympic and Paralympic Games. Initially, they had planned to obtain 1,624 tonnes, but nobody was able to produce this amount. The large order was criticized over claims that ice therapy is not proven to be widely effective, excessive or improper use can be harmful, for its high monetary cost, and particularly for being harmful to the environment. On the day before the opening ceremony, academics from France and other countries published an editorial in the British Journal of Sports Medicine criticizing the excessive ice, writing that "The amount of energy and water needed to produce, store, and transport the ice is not good for the planet". The scale was particularly criticized- around 64 tonnes of ice was used at the 2020 Olympics, about one-tenth the amount ordered in Paris.

== See also ==
- Epiphany bathing
- Dousing
- Polar bear plunge
- Winter swimming
