= Nikolay Shumakov =

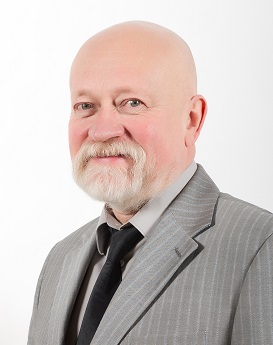

The President of the Union of Moscow Architects and the Union of Architects of Russia
- Incumbent
- Assumed office Since 2012

Personal details
- Born: Nikolay Ivanovich Shumakov; Николай Иванович Шумаков; 1 April 1954 (age 72) Chelyabinsk, Russian SFSR, Soviet Union
- Citizenship: Soviet Union, Russia
- Education: MArchI

Nikolay Ivanovich Shumakov (Russian: Николай Иванович Шумаков; born 1 April 1954, Chelyabinsk) is a Russian architect, President of the Union of Moscow Architects (since 2012) and President of the Union of Architects of Russia (since 2016), Chief Architect of the Metrogiprotrans, Academician of the Russian Academy of Arts, Professor of the International Academy of Architecture, Moscow Branch.

== Biography ==
Nikolay Shumakov was born in Chelyabinsk. He graduated of Moscow Architectural Institute in 1977. He is the author of Moscow Metro stations such as: Park Pobedy, Sretensky Boulevard, Zyablikovo, Bittsevsky Park, Vorobyovy Gory, the second exit of the Metro station Mayakovskaya, stations of Butovskaya Line, Moscow Monorail. Also he is the author of the first famous cable-stayed Zhivopisny Bridge in Moscow, and the largest in Europe, the airport complex Terminal «А» of Vnukovo International Airport with an underground railway terminal and an underground section of the railway.

In recent years, Nikolay Shumakov has held several personal exhibitions of painting in Russia and abroad. Nikolay Shumakov's works are noted by numerous Russian and international architectural awards. He is the winner of the awards of the Brussels, Strasbourg and Paris international exhibitions of innovations and new technologies.

The Auguste Perret Prize for Applied Technology in Architecture will be presented to Nikolay Shumakov on September 6, 2017 in Seoul at the 26th World Congress of the International Union of Architects.

== Personal life ==
He is married, has two daughters and three grandchildren.
