= Porfiry Ivanov =

Ukrainian mystic

Porfiry Korneyevich Ivanov (Ukrainian: Порфірій Корнійович Іванов) (February 20, 1898 – April 10, 1983) was a Ukrainian (born in what was Russian Empire at the time and is modern day Ukraine) mystic whose beliefs have attained a cult status, with followers estimated in the tens of thousands. He was a self-proclaimed doctor, although he had no formal certification. The Russian Orthodox Church has considered his teachings to be heretical, and calls the cult "Ivanovites". Ivanov was imprisoned in a psychiatric hospital.

Porfiri Ivanov's sect has its own hymn, written by Ivanov himself. The rhythm of the hymn was adopted from the French national anthem La Marseillaise. Ivanov promoted Detka (literally - "baby", his usual addressing to the followers), a health system that included dousing. He based this system on the belief that it was healthy to remove one's clothing while outdoors in cold weather, in order to become closer to nature. Ivanov also advocated swimming in icy water, a belief that has been applied to the practice of ice swimming.

In his thirties he supposedly cured himself of cancer through spiritual cleansing and exposure to extreme cold weather

== See also ==
- Wim Hof
