= NSVL =

NSVL may refer to:

- North Sea Volunteer Lifeguards, an English volunteer lifeguard club
- NSVL is an Estonian abbreviation of Nõukogude Sotsialistlike Vabariikide Liit which means Soviet Union
