= Nuala Moore =

Irish swimmer

Personal information
- Full name: Nuala Moore
- Born: November 28, 1986 (age 38); County Donegal, Ireland

Sport
- Sport: Swimming

Nuala Moore is an Irish swimmer known for open water swimming and ice swimming.

In 2006, she was one of six swimmers to swim around the coast of Ireland in a relay, the first-ever swim of over 1300 km around the coast. Then in 2008 she did a double relay crossing of the English Channel.

She was the 2011 awardee of the Margaret Smith Award of the Irish Long Distance Swimming Association, given for increasing the profile of open water swimming. She won several medals in the first-ever World Ice Swimming Championship (2013, Murmansk, Russia).

In 2013, Moore swam the Bering Strait in a relay from Russia to the US. She was one of only four women, in March 2013 to "[complete] a 1000 metre swim at 0 degrees in Murmansk north of the arctic circle [sic]". After her Bering Strait swim, she was nominated for World Open Water Swimming Woman of the Year in 2013 and chosen as one of the "People of the Year" by Irish adventure magazine Outsider.

In 2015, she competed in the first Ice Swimming World Championships in Russia. Also in 2015 she won an age group record for swimming 1000 metres in below-5 degree Celsius water.

She was featured in a Science Gallery exhibit in 2014 on fat.
