= Boxing Day Dip =

Annual charity swimming event

The Boxing Day Dip is a charity event where many of the swimmers are in fancy dress swim in the sea on Boxing Day. There are several such dips held around Europe, but the largest is organised by the Red sky Foundation and Lions Club of Sunderland, England. Participants are expected to wear fancy dress and jump into the North Sea. (See also Winter swimming).

== Tenby's Boxing Day swim ==
The swim in Pembrokeshire, Wales, started in 1970 and has become Tenby's main Christmas attraction, with around 600 swimmers and thousands of onlookers each year. With everyone swimming for charity, and the majority in fancy dress, each of the swimmers receives a medal for their efforts. Started by the Tenby Sea Swimming Association (TSSA), the Osborne family has been associated with the spectacle from the beginning and Chris Osborne, chairman of TSSA has seen the event take place in every weather condition from brilliant sunshine to freezing wind.

== Sunderland's Boxing Day dip ==
It is held at Seaburn beach in Sunderland and it attracts one thousand dippers every year. Up to five thousand spectators turn out to witness the dip, including the City’s Mayor and Mayoress. Originating in 1974 the dip is one of the oldest events in the country. The dip of 2004 raised nearly £60,000 for charity, with several teams taking part.

== North Sea Volunteer Lifeguards' Boxing Day swim at Whitley Bay ==
A swim or dip in the sea over the festive period (be it Christmas, Boxing Day, or New Year) is a traditional event for many lifeguard clubs across the UK, despite sea temperatures ranging anywhere from 4 °C to 10 °C.North Sea Volunteer Lifeguards (NSVL) has held a Boxing Day swim every year since the club's formation in 1998, jumping in the North Sea from their base at Whitley Bay on the north-east coast of England. The event continues to be one of the year's biggest social gatherings of the club, with members travelling from far distances to participate.

== East Anglia festive season swims ==
Several charity swims take place in East Anglian resorts on Christmas and Boxing Day.
