= Serebryany Bor (park) =

Park in Moscow, Russia

- Серебряный Бор
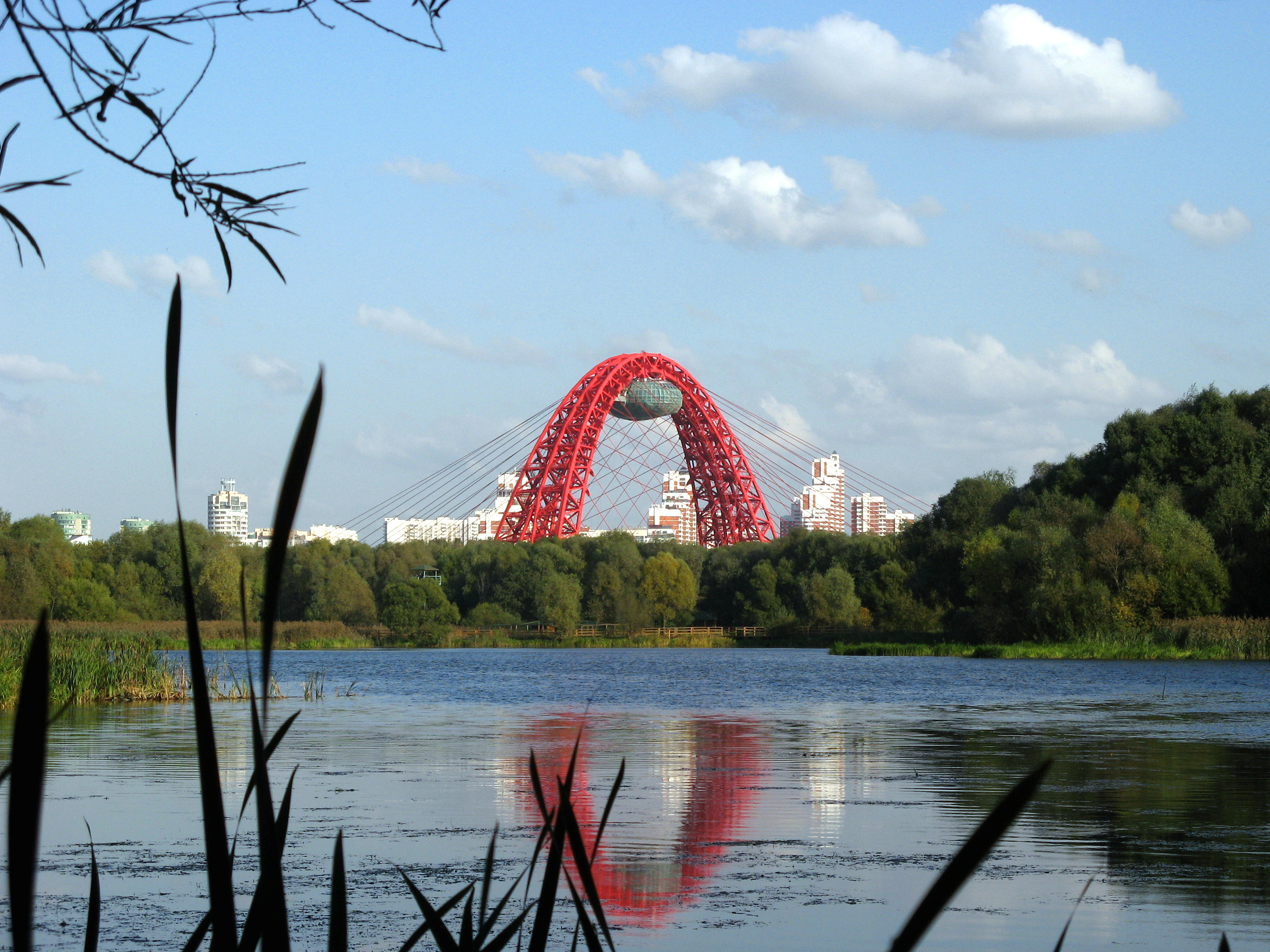
- Serebryany Bor with a view of the Zhivopisny Bridge, 2008
- Location in Moscow
- Location: Moscow, Russia
- Coordinates: 55°46′50″N 37°24′58″E
- Area: 328.6 hectares (812 acres)
- Created: October 17, 1991
- Public transit: Polezhayevskaya; Oktyabrskoye Polye; Shchukinskaya; Khoroshyovskaya; Khoroshyovo; Zorge; Krylatskoye; Strogino; Molodyozhnaya

Serebryany Bor (Russian: Серебряный Бор, literally "Silver Pinewood") is a large forest park in north-west Moscow. The park is a natural monument of regional significance and a protected area of the city of Moscow. It poses an artificial island that was formed during the creation of the Khoroshevskoye spryamlenie canal ("Khoroshevsky cutoff" canal). Serebryany Bor covers an area of 328.6 hectares.

It is also a concentration of luxury real estate owned by wealthy businessmen and government officials.

== History ==
In Old Russian chronicles and legal documents, the word "borъ" (боръ) meant "pine" or "needles"—literally "that which pricks"—and later came to mean "coniferous forest". The name "Serebryany Ovrag" ("Silver Ravine"), which refers to this area, first appears in a 17th-century boundary deed (mezhevaya gramota). At that time, the name was used for the wooded territory that is now part of the Serebryany Bor forestry.

This forest was mentioned in a 1735 order concerning the reconstruction of old stables in Khoroshyovo. The park is also known as Khoroshyovsky, after the former suburban village of Khoroshyovo, now part of the Khoroshyovo-Mnyovniki District.

From the 16th century until the October Revolution of 1917, the lands of the Khoroshyovsky Bor belonged either to the tsar's family or to individuals close to the imperial court. In the 19th century, it was home to an artillery depot and the Fanagoriya Regiment.

In the early 20th century, a summer dacha settlement was established in the area, taking the name "Serebryany Bor".

In 1937, the construction of the Khoroshyovsky navigation canal—part of Moscow’s water infrastructure project—cut the area off from the mainland, turning it into an artificial island. The project was designed by architect V. A. Petrov. That same year, a large reinforced concrete bridge—the Khoroshyovsky Bridge—was built to connect the island with Khoroshyovskoye Highway, designed by architect I. S. Fridlender and engineer A. A. Belogolovy.

After the Great Patriotic War (World War II), the island became a popular vacation and recreation spot for Muscovites.

In summer it was lively and joyful, with many summer residents and young people. Boat stations and beaches opened on the river; volleyballs echoed on the courts from morning till night—it all felt like a movie. [...] Then autumn would come, the dachas would empty, and you’d barely see a soul in the fields or woods, except the occasional gardener hurrying to the bus with a sack of potatoes on his back. Spider silk drifted in the quiet air, fallen leaves filled the paths—no one cleaned them up until the snow—and the lonely hum of the last riverboat echoed down the Moskva River with a single chilled passenger huddled below deck.

— Yury Trifonov, novella "Students"

In the autumn of 1991, the Presidium of the Moscow City Council passed decree No. 201 on 17 October 1991, designating Serebryany Bor a natural monument of regional significance. Following this, the area was cleaned, landscaped, and an ecological trail was created. In 2017, the island underwent further upgrades, including improved recreation facilities and an entrance area to the park.

== Territory ==
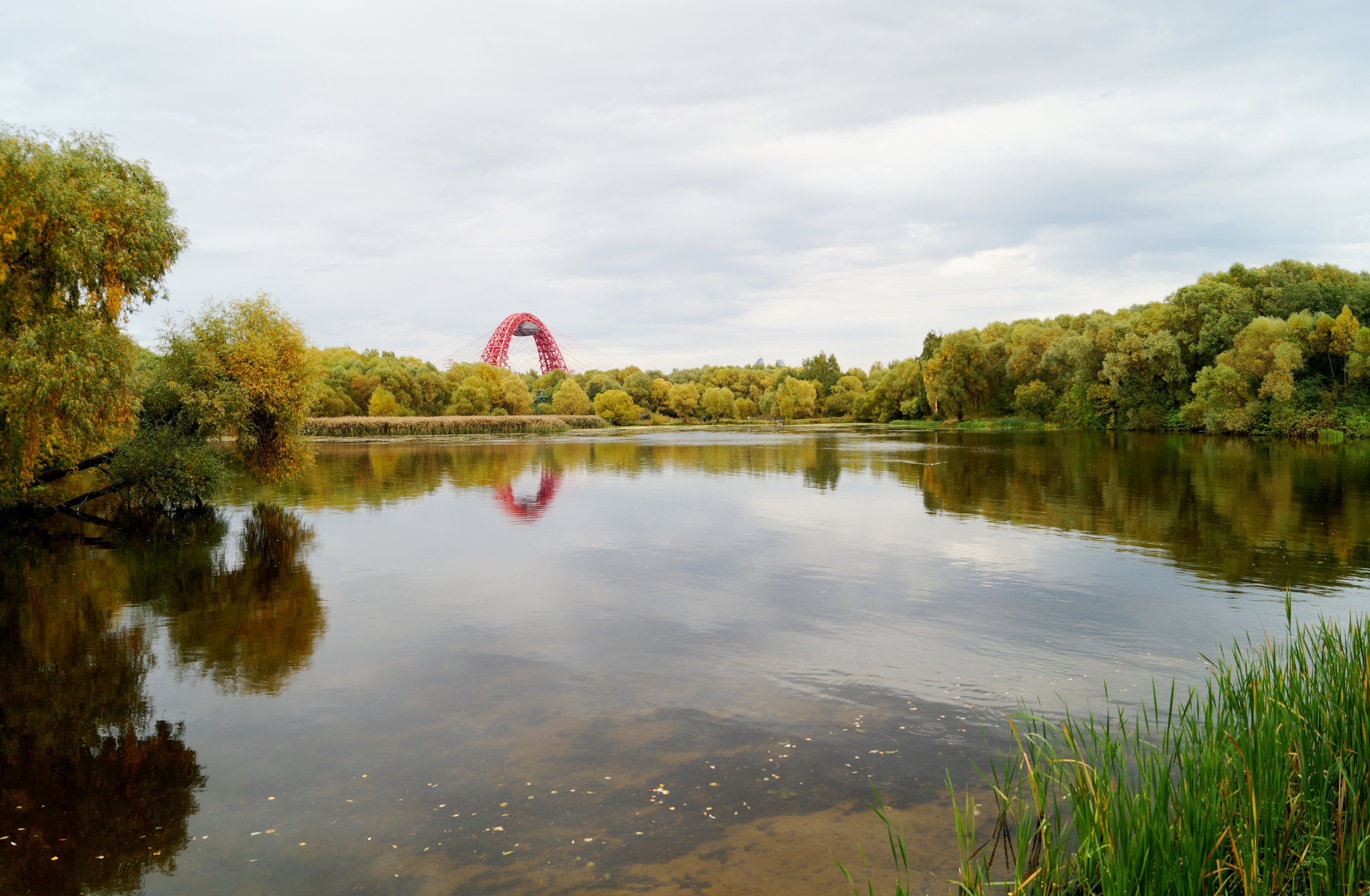
View of Lake Bezdonnoye and Zhivopisny Bridge, 2015

The park is an artificial island formed during the construction of the Khoroshyovskoye Straightening Canal. A bay known as Gluboky Bay, or Lake Bezdonnoye (literally: "Bottomless Lake"), extends deep into the forested area. The lake, with a surface area of about 16–17 hectares, was connected to the Moskva River in the 1950s and is now an artificial inlet.

The park contains two squares, three beaches—including Moscow’s largest nudist beach—as well as an ecological trail with visitor rest areas and enclosures for rare animals and birds.

=== Park Zones ===
The park is divided into five zones.

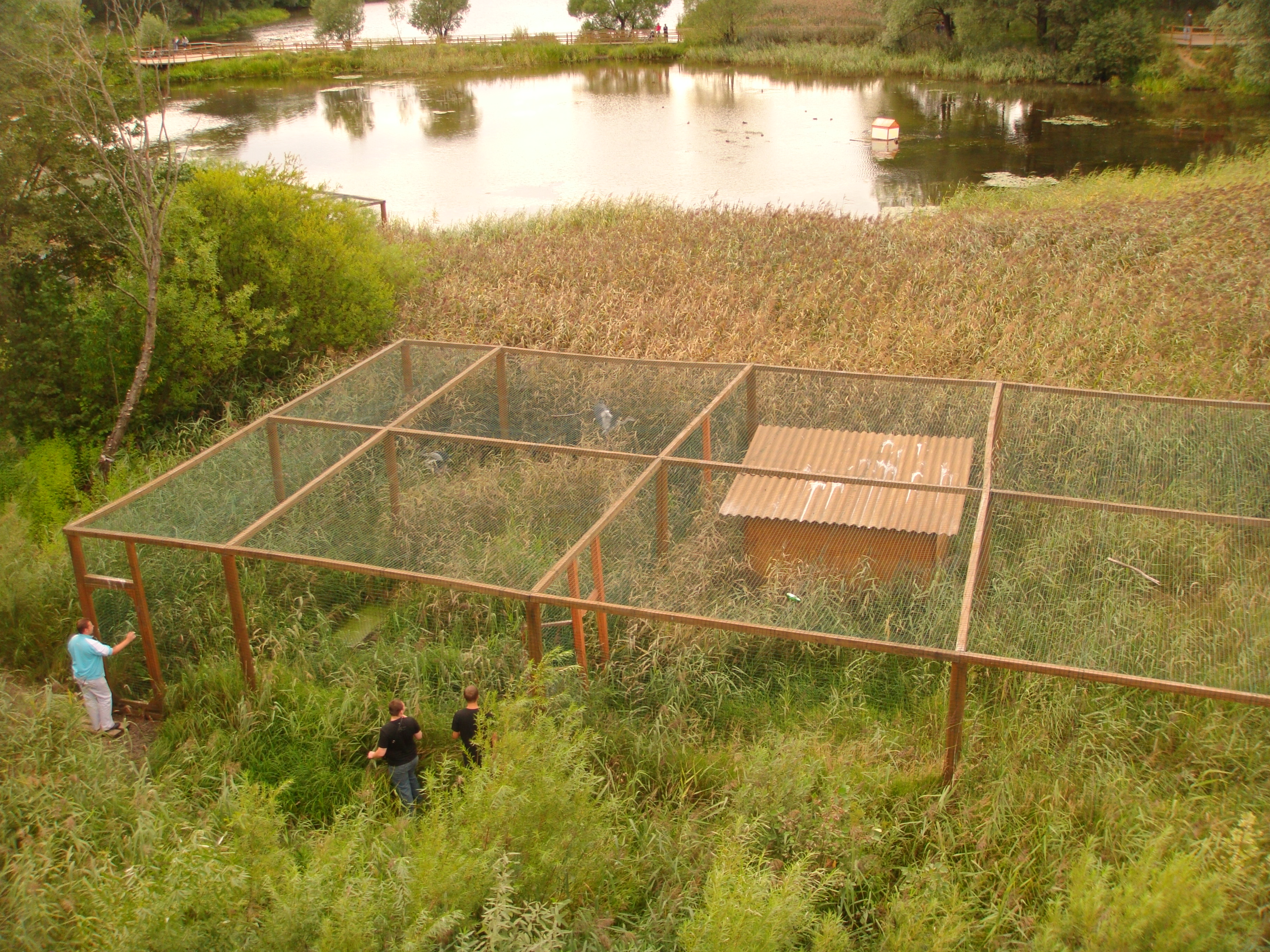
View from the tower of bird enclosures and the ecological trail

The protected zone (84 hectares) is designated for scientific research and for preserving and restoring the ecosystems of the natural monument. Ecological and walking trails are developed here, along with guided tours and educational signage indicating the rules for visiting protected areas. Demonstration areas feature representative species of flora and fauna found in the park.

The walking zone (78.7 hectares) includes nature and walking trails, newly planted trees and berry bushes. Artificial nests and feeding points are installed to attract birds. Infrastructure includes observation points, rain shelters, informational stands, and directional signs.

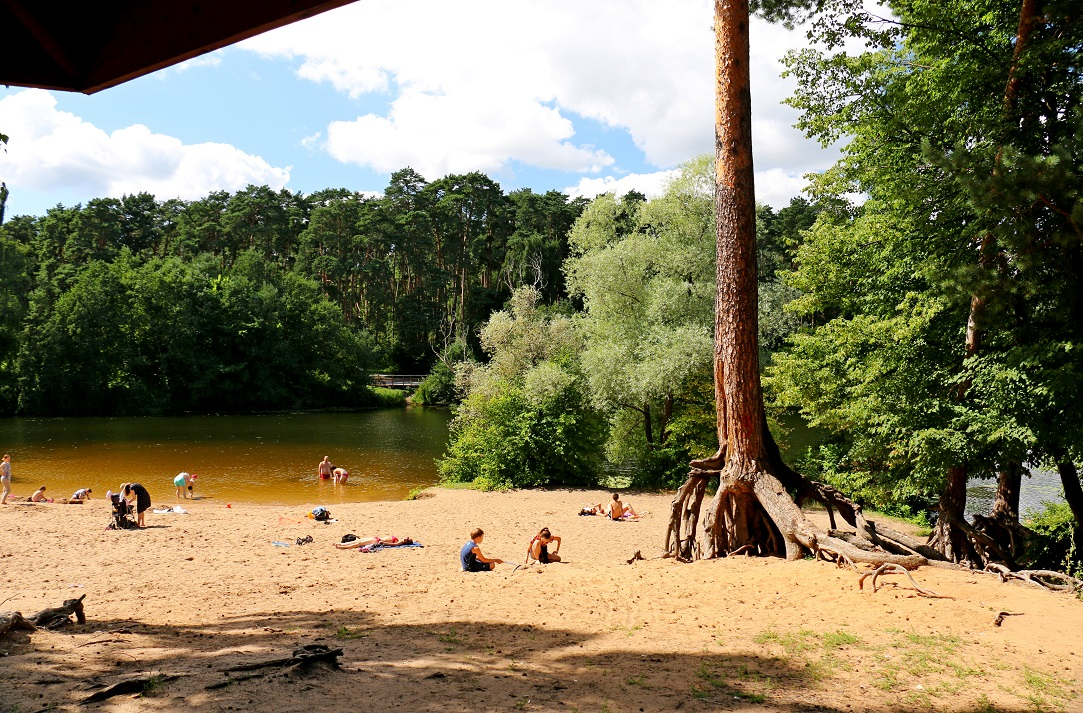
Beach in Serebryany Bor

The recreational zone (32.8 hectares) includes recreation centers, cultural and aesthetic facilities, food courts, retail outlets, rest areas, and sports facilities. Landscaping with local plant species is carried out, and artificial bird nests and feeders are installed. Walking paths, playgrounds, and educational signs about nature conservation are constructed and maintained, along with reconstruction of beaches.

The administrative and utility zone (10.8 hectares) houses a fire station, police post, cavalry unit (part of the operational regiment), electric vehicle parking, and visitor parking lots.

The external users’ zone covers 122.3 hectares and includes residential buildings, sewage treatment facilities, and utilities. Nearly half the island is occupied by elite private residences—including palaces, mansions, and luxury estates—owned by prominent individuals such as presidential envoy Yury Trutnev, former Federal Migration Service head Konstantin Romodanovsky, Patriarch Kirill, singer Oleg Gazmanov, the wife of Rosneft CEO Igor Sechin, and entrepreneurs Vladimir Yevtushenkov, Grigory Berezkin, Vagit Alekperov, and Leonid Fedun. Some plots belong to the Ministry of Internal Affairs, the Ministry of Defense, and the Ministry of Foreign Affairs. Parts of the territory are classified, including residences of officials who have concealed property data—such as the wife of former FSB director Nikolai Patrushev.

== Flora and fauna ==
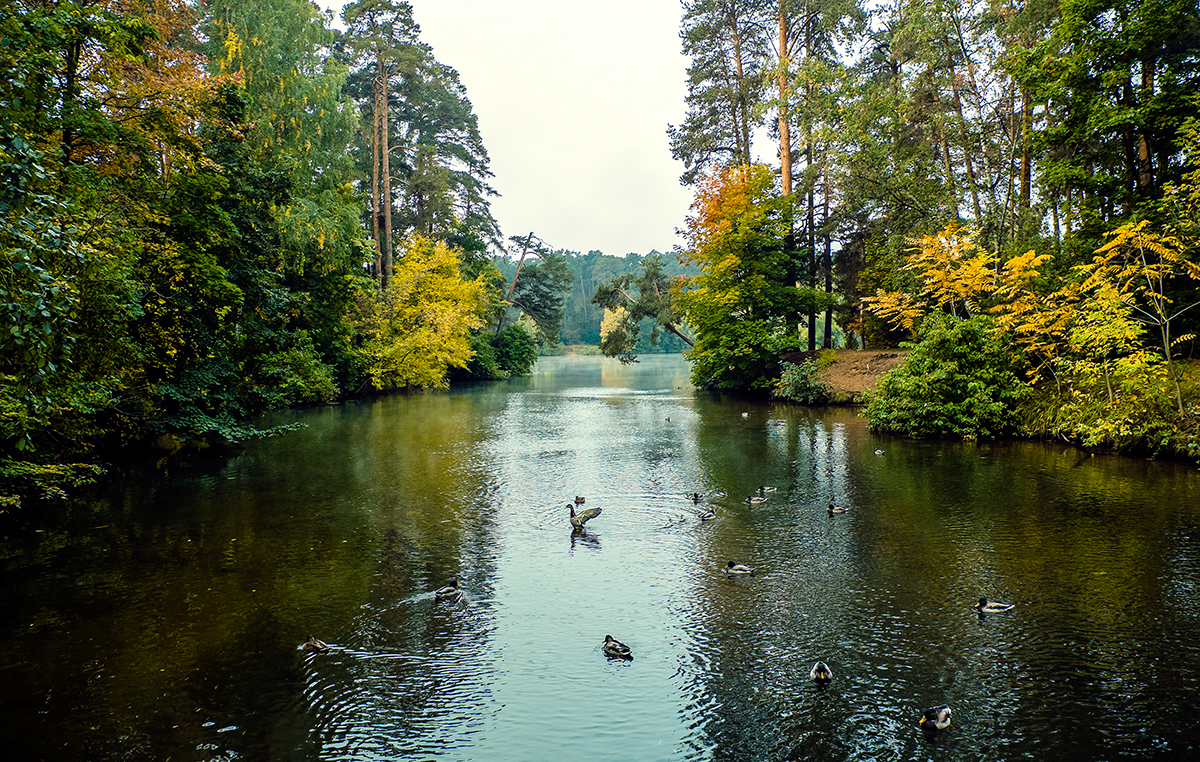
Ducks in Serebryany Bor, 2014

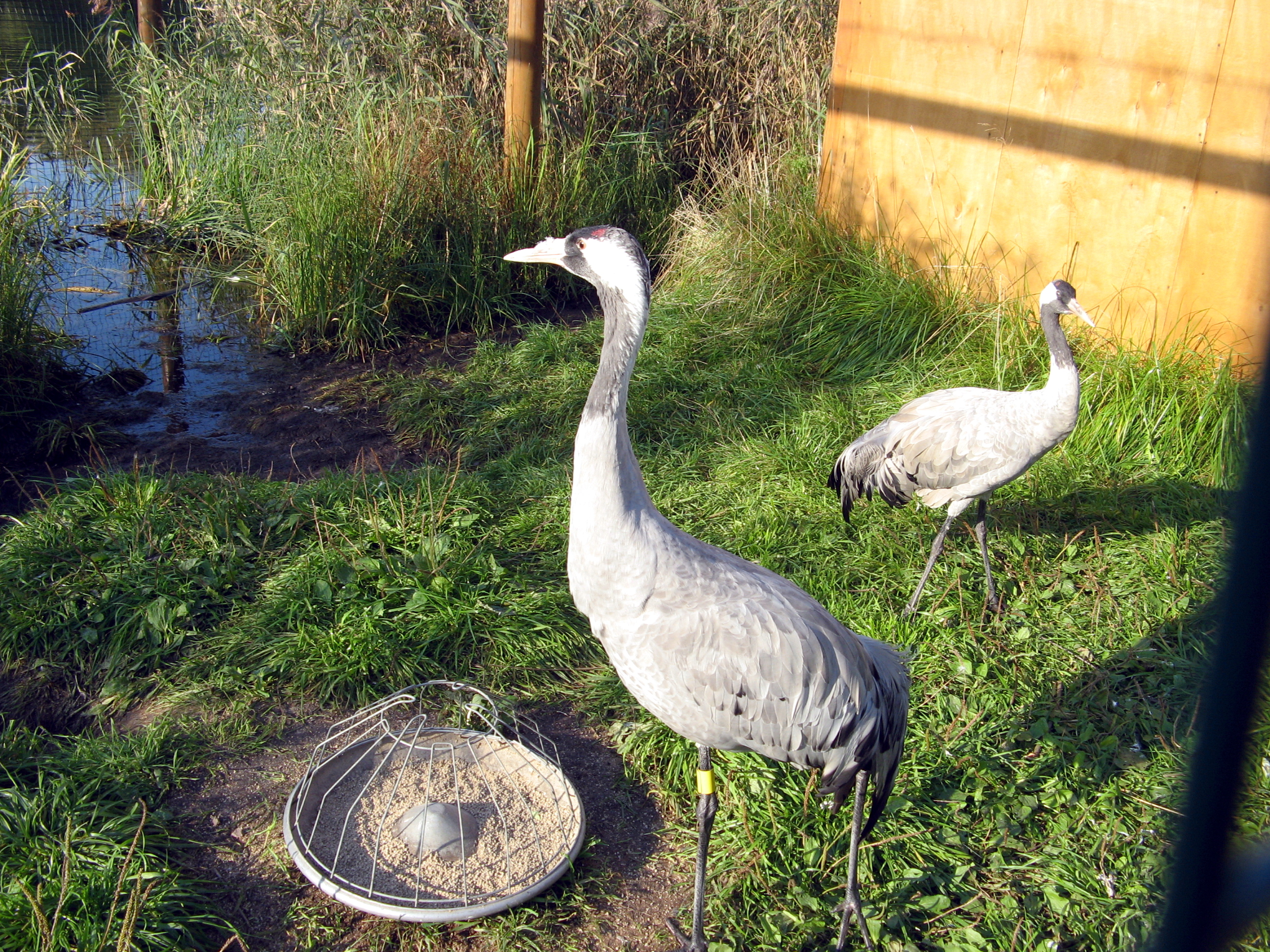
Cranes in Serebryany Bor, 2008

Serebryany Bor performs water protection, environmental, and recreational functions as a forested area. Two ecological routes have been developed on the island: “By Lake Bezdonnoye” and “In Harmony with Nature”.

The flora of Serebryany Bor includes around 400 species of vascular plants: 324 herbaceous species, 40 tree species, 34 shrub species, and two subshrubs. Common species include willow, birch, oak, pine, linden, and elm, as well as Manchurian walnut, larch, fern, bilberry, lingonberry, lilac, barberry, chokeberry, serviceberry, sea buckthorn, cherry, currant, and others. Several species listed in the Red Book of Moscow can be found here, including northern monkshood, yellow anemone, creeping lady's tresses, green strawberry, snow-white water lily, arrowhead, sweet flag, white poplar, northern red oak, amphibious bistort, lily of the valley, white campion, Fischer's pink, field clover, and dense corydalis.

The fauna consists of around 100 species of animals. The island is home to moles, hares, European polecats, common shrews, voles, squirrels, beavers, and otters. Species listed in the Red Book of Moscow include weasels, brown hare, mountain hare, and European hedgehog, stoats, and smooth newts.

Ornithologists note the presence of thrushes, woodpeckers, wagtails, and larks, as well as hawks, herons, and orioles. Nesting birds include the Ural owl, raven, marsh tit, and shrike, along with warblers, reed warblers, nightingales, and others. Several species are listed in the Red Book of Moscow, including long-eared owl, Eurasian hobby, northern goshawk, common kingfisher, moorhen, black woodpecker, and sand martin.

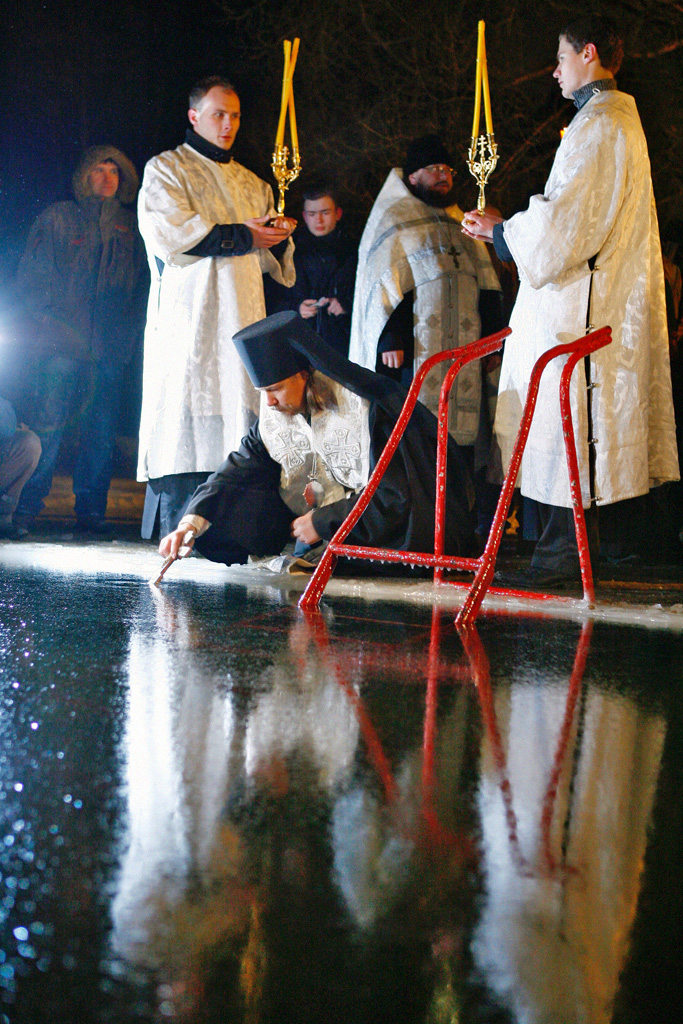
Epiphany bathing, 2008

In addition to bird feeders, special shelters have been installed along the ecological trail for herons, cranes, ducks, muskrats, otters, and birds of prey.

Serebryany Bor is also home to a relict freshwater crustacean and the swan mussel (Anodonta), both listed in the Red Book of Moscow. The local fish fauna includes pike, gudgeon, silver crucian carp, bream, gobies, as well as protected species such as dace.

== Recreation ==
Serebryany Bor offers a variety of recreational facilities, including sports and children’s playgrounds, summer cafes and restaurants, as well as free, well-maintained and guarded public beaches. These areas are equipped with medical stations, rescue stations operated by the Ministry of Emergency Situations (EMERCOM), bio-toilets, showers, changing cabins, and rental points for sports and beach equipment.

Picnic areas are equipped with barbecue grills, tables, benches, and trash bins.

The island annually hosts the Eco-Picnic festival, and offers free guided tours along the ecological trail “By Lake Bezdonnoye”.

In winter, ski trails are laid out on the island and photo tours are organized along them. In winter, Beach No. 2 becomes an ice rink with skate rentals.

Lake Bezdonnoye also features an ice hole for Epiphany bathing, an Orthodox tradition observed annually in January.
