= Zhivopisny Bridge =

Cable-stayed bridge in Moscow, Russia

Coordinates: 55°46′38″N 37°26′48″E

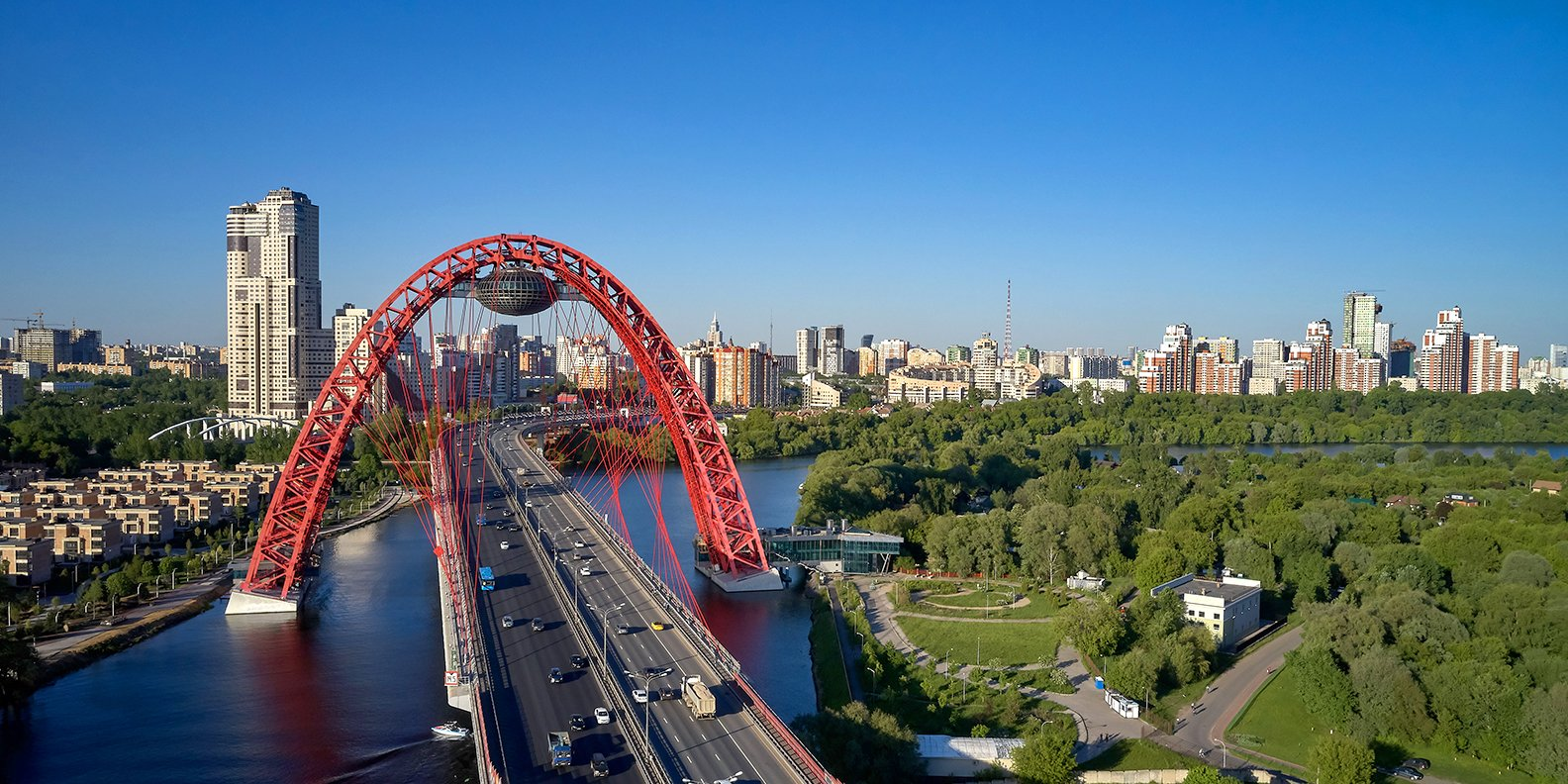

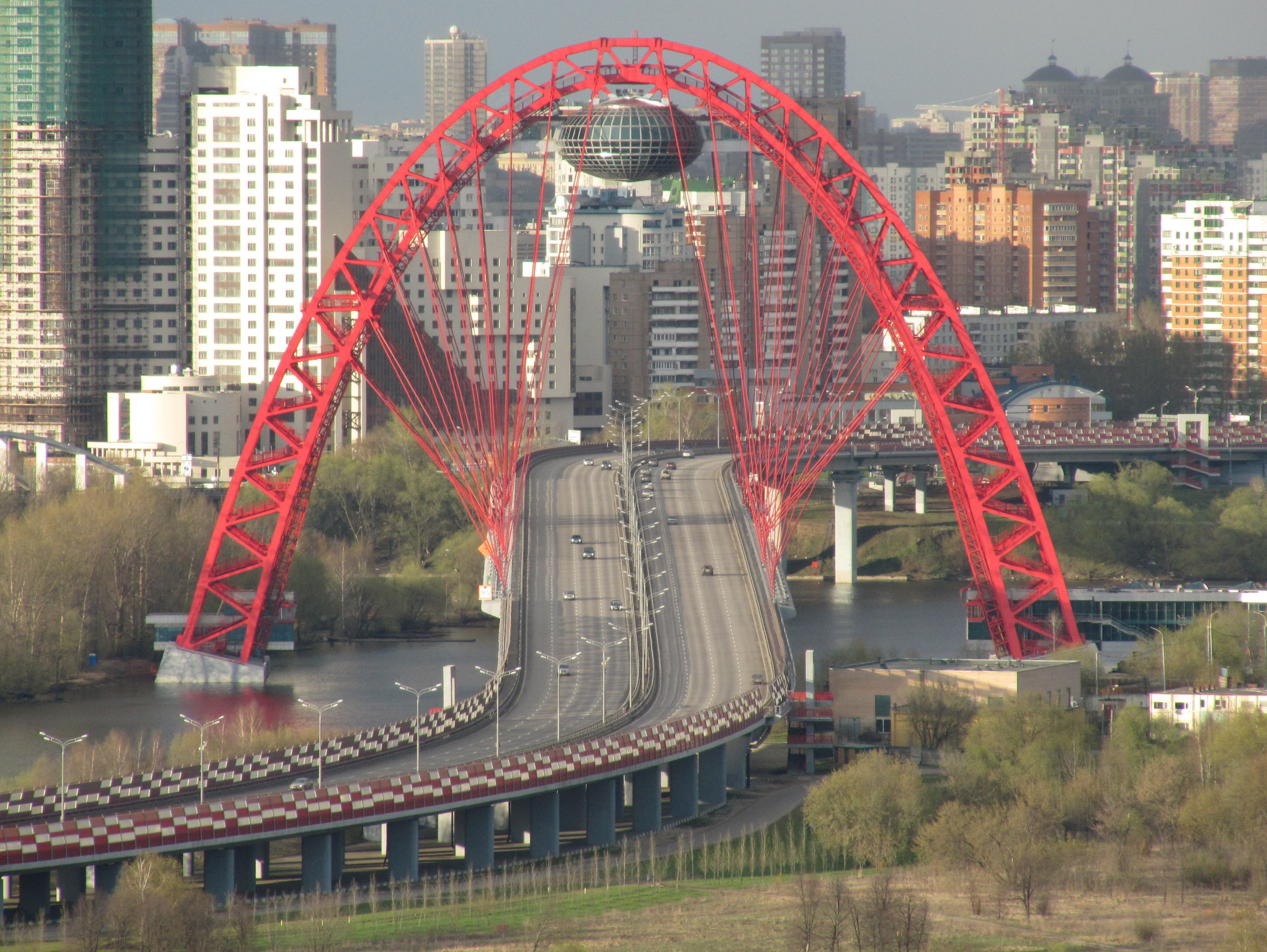
Zhivopisny Bridge. April 2010.

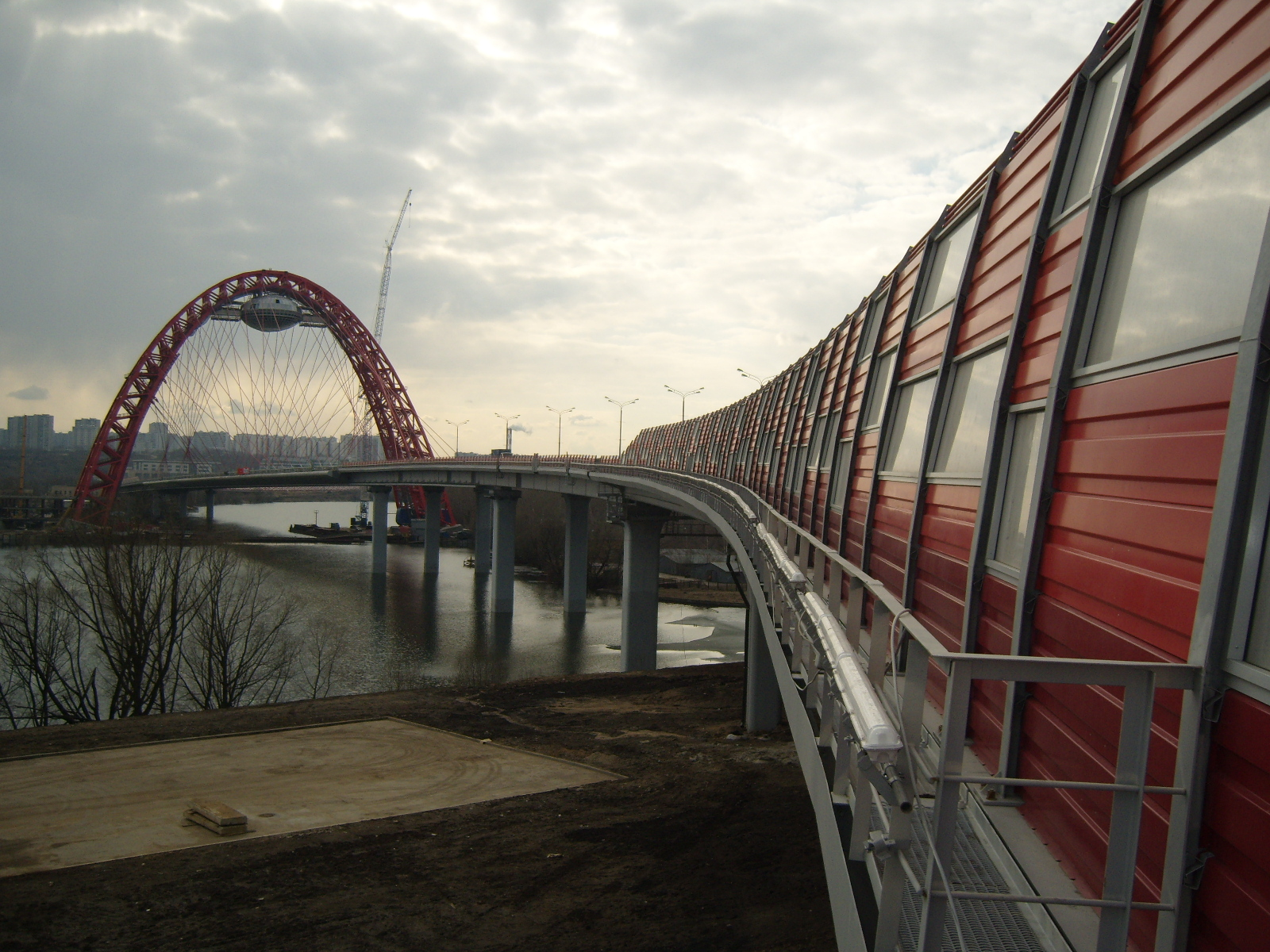
Zhivopisny Bridge. March 2008.

Zhivopisny Bridge (Russian: Живописный Мост [ʐɨvɐˈpʲisnɨj most], lit. 'Picturesque Bridge') is a cable-stayed bridge that spans Moskva (river) in north-western Moscow, Russia. It is the first cable-stayed bridge in Moscow. It opened on 27 December 2007 as a part of Krasnopresnensky avenue. It is also the highest cable-stayed bridge in Europe. The designer of the project is the architect Nikolay Shumakov.

== Design and specifications ==
The bridge is unique in that most of its length runs along the river, not across it (see the site plan). Thus the bridge and highway it carries bypasses the protected territory of Serebryany Bor island.

The total length of an S-shaped deck exceeds 1.5 kilometers, including a 409.5-meter long, 47-meter wide main section running 30 meters above and along the centerline of river Moskva. The main pylon is a 105-meter high arch across the river, carrying the weight of deck through 78 cables

Under the top of the arch, there is a disk-like structure that was intended to house a restaurant. The restaurant project is now abandoned due to fire safety concerns and a lack of investment.

== Operation ==
Zhivopisny Bridge was opened on 27 December 2007. In early 2008, Moscow residents began discussing in personal blogs — later echoed by the media — alleged technical issues in the bridge's construction, such as loose nuts and missing fasteners on the protective casings of the cable-stayed anchor nodes. After an unscheduled inspection by Rostekhnadzor (Federal Service for Environmental, Technological, and Nuclear Supervision), these concerns were refuted. It turned out that the covers had not yet been permanently fastened with metal bolts, as the internal dampers of the stays were still being adjusted, which had caused misunderstanding among the public.

From 2008 to 2012, the city authorities imposed night-time traffic restrictions (from 23:00 to 06:00) on the bridge and the adjacent North-West Tunnel in the Novorizhskoye direction. This was done to carry out comprehensive testing of the tunnel's safety systems and ensure safe installation of the observation deck structures. Typically, traffic was limited to one lane, and in some cases, two.

Originally, a restaurant was planned for the observation deck capsule, but the idea was eventually abandoned. The main reason was the absence of a sewage system: due to wind and vehicle-induced vibrations, the structure experiences significant movement, which could lead to the rupture of sewage pipes. Due to a lack of funding, the installation of communications and fastening systems was suspended, making the use of the "flying saucer" as a restaurant unfeasible.

In 2011, the Moscow authorities proposed opening a civil registry office (ZAGS) on the Zhivopisny Bridge. One hall was planned to be located at the base of the support structure on the right bank, in a former construction building, and the second inside the observation capsule. Initially, the opening of the wedding palace was scheduled for 2014, and interior works were carried out. However, some interior elements were later lost, and heating issues inside the capsule arose, posing a risk to its structural stability. By 2016, the main construction works were completed, but there were difficulties installing elevators. A year later, a French company undertook the project to install elevators with curved shafts that fit the capsule's shape. The opening was scheduled for 2018. As of 2024, the capsule of the suspension bridge remains unused. The registry office was never opened, with the main reason being unresolved fire safety requirements. The fate of the ellipsoid remains uncertain.

== See also ==
- List of bridges in Moscow
- Gateway Arch
- Most SNP, a cable-stayed bridge in Bratislava with a restaurant on the tower
