= Dousing =

Making wet by throwing liquid over

Dousing is the practice of making something or someone wet by throwing liquid over them, e.g., by pouring water, generally cold, over oneself. A related practice is ice swimming. Some consider cold water dousing to be a form of asceticism.

== Cold water dousing ==
Cold water dousing is used to "shock" the body into a kind of fever. The body's reaction is similar to the mammalian diving reflex or possibly temperature biofeedback. Several meditative and awareness techniques seem to share similar effects with elevated temperature, such as Tummo. Compare cold water dousing with ice swimming.

The effects of dousing are usually more intense and longer-lasting than just a cold shower. Ending a shower with cold water is an old naturopathic tradition. There are those who believe that this fever is helpful in killing harmful bacteria and leaving the hardier beneficial bacteria in the body.

== National traditions ==
=== Burma ===
- Thingyan (Water Festival) was celebrated from 13 to 17 April in 2001 and the rituals included dousing.

=== Japan ===
- Some Japanese ascetic practices, as with Shinto misogi practices, include dousing. This is seen, for example, with some Aikido practitioners. Morihei Ueshiba was known to practice cold water misogi.
- Kamakura, Japan has a temple whose Nichiren Buddhist priests in training practice a ritual of 100 days of fasting, meditation and walking which ends with stripping to loincloths and dousing with ice cold water.

=== Poland ===
Śmigus-dyngus (or Dyngus Day) is a festival held on Easter Monday, traditionally celebrated by boys throwing water over girls.

=== Russia ===
Jumping in freezing lakes, ice swimming, is an old Russian tradition that goes hand in hand with going to banya, a sauna-like bath. Some douse with a bucket of cold water. The bucket is filled with water and left out overnight. They then walk with it outside and spill it over themselves. Preferences include being barefoot outside on the earth, and performing dousing at certain times and more frequently when ill.

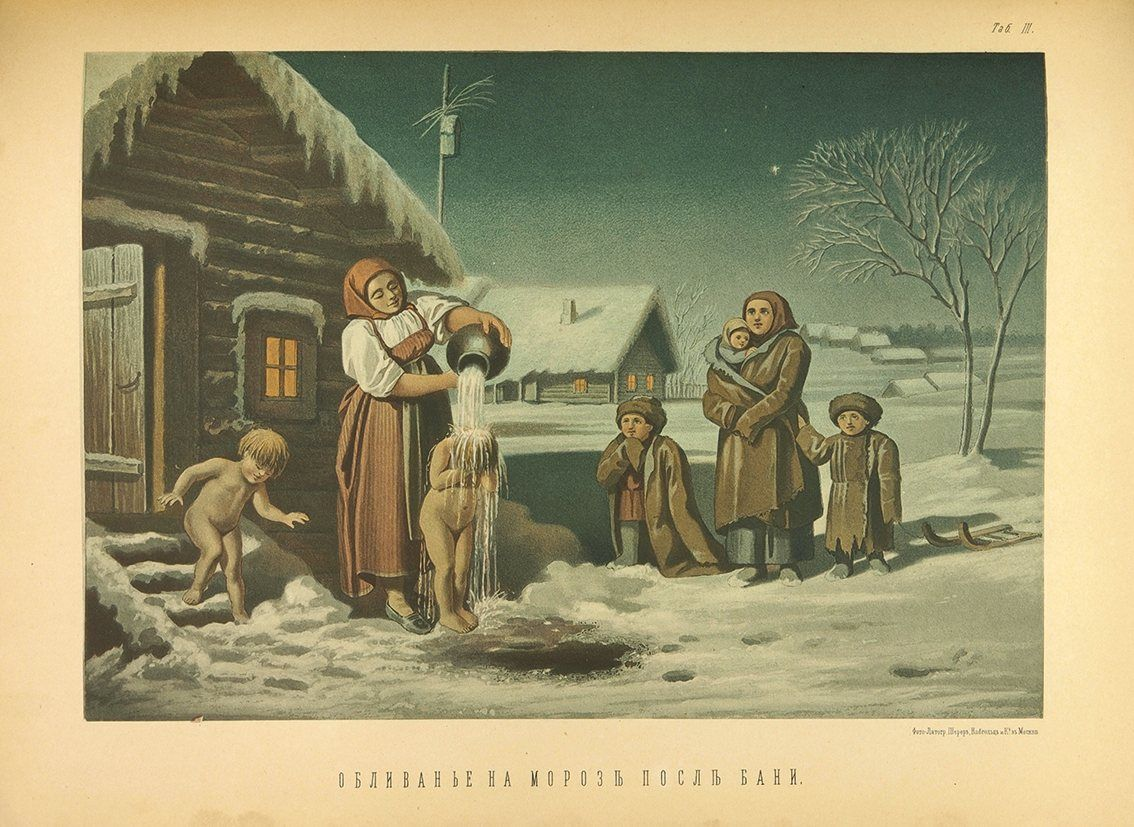
Dousing after banya. Russia

For some, dousing accompanies fasting (absence of all food and water) as an alternate means for the body to obtain water.

Some follow cold water dousing with air-drying outside or in wintertime taking a "snow bath" by rubbing handfuls of snow on the body or lying/moving in it.

- Porfiry Ivanov's health system includes cold water dousing.
- Cold water dousing is practiced by some Systema martialists.

=== Thailand ===
Songkran is a popular festival in April which includes dousing using water. It is also celebrated by the Dai people in Yunnan Province in China, and in Laos, Cambodia and Myanmar during the traditional New Year.

== See also ==
- Baptism
- Hydrotherapy
- The Polar Bear Plunge
- Water Festival
