= Coney Island Polar Bear Club =

Oldest winter bathing organization in the United States

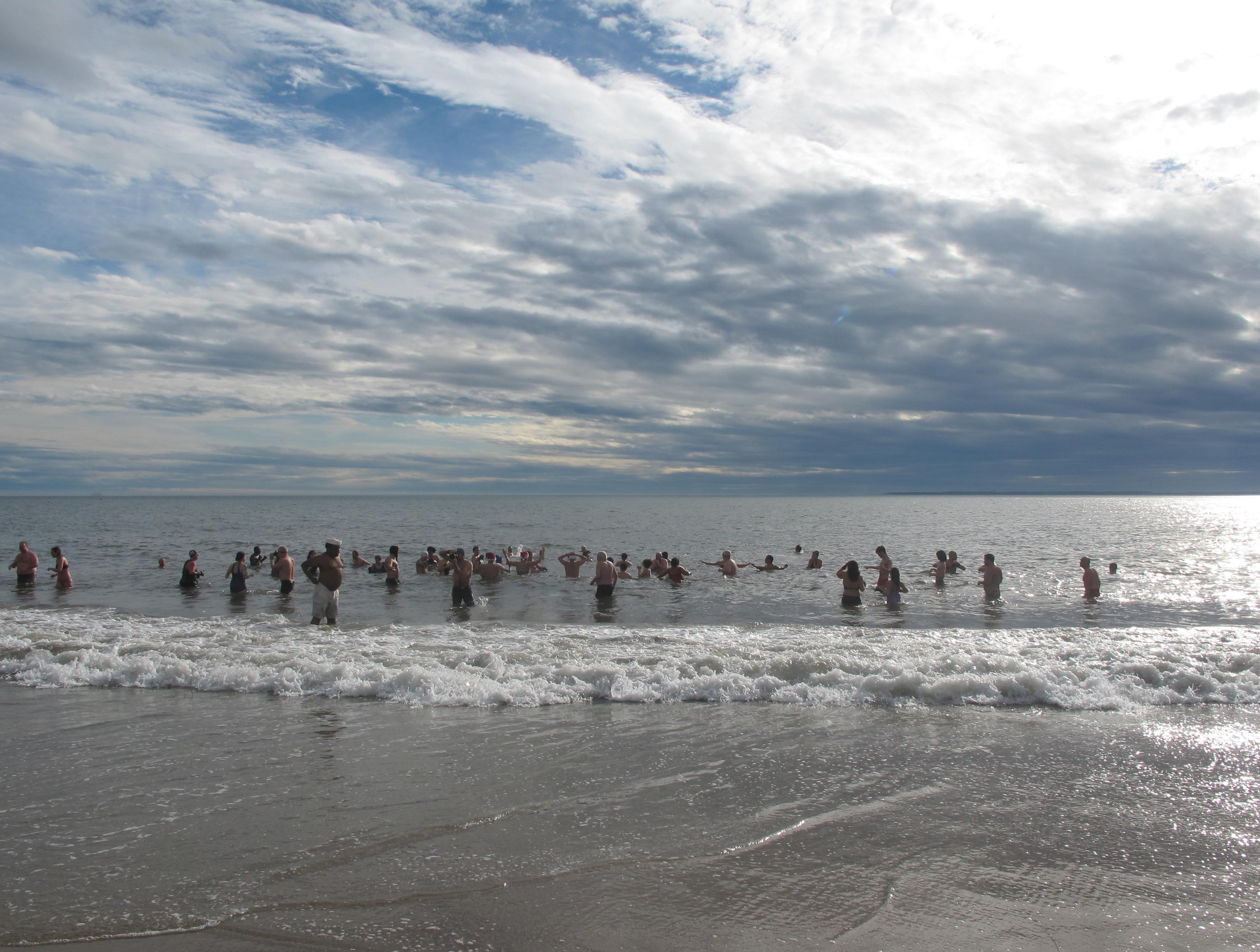
The club in the water in December 2013

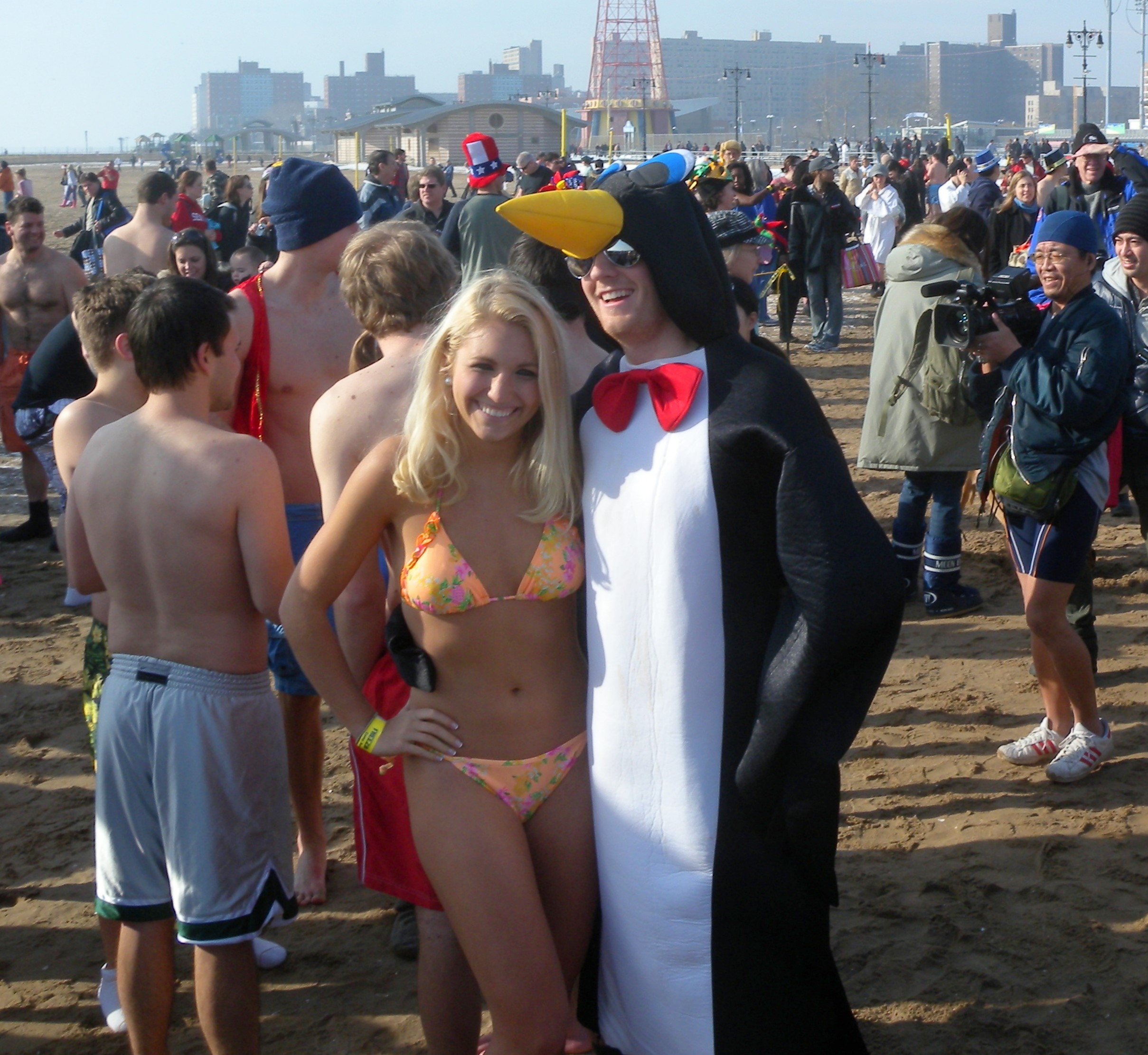
New Years Day 2011

The Coney Island Polar Bear Club is the oldest winter bathing organization in the United States, whose members regularly take polar bear plunges in the winters. The club was founded by famed health advocate Bernarr McFadden in 1903.

The club began using the event to raise funds for Special Olympics starting in 2005, and Camp Sunshine in 2007. In 2018, the club decided to support local groups and charities and began partnering with the Alliance for Coney Island to raise funds for local nonprofit organizations.

Members swim in the Atlantic Ocean at Coney Island, New York, United States every Sunday from November through April. Every New Year's Day, the club is joined by participants from around the country, who partake in an annual swim. The 2005 event had 300 participants and 6000 onlookers. The Chief Polar Bear blows a conch shell to gather the swimmers before they run into the water.

The club was mentioned in popular culture. It is mentioned on the season three episode of Seinfeld, "The Pez Dispenser". In the episode Kramer informs Jerry that he has joined the club, claiming it to be 'invigorating'. It was also publicized on The Daily Show with Jon Stewart, in a taped segment by Dan Bakkedahl about the effects of global warming on the club in faux-nature documentary style.

Famous biker and bike-builder Indian Larry once said that the only club he was part of was the Coney Island Polar Bear Club, and he even had the club name and logo tattooed on his arm.
