= Polar bear plunge =

Water event held in the winter

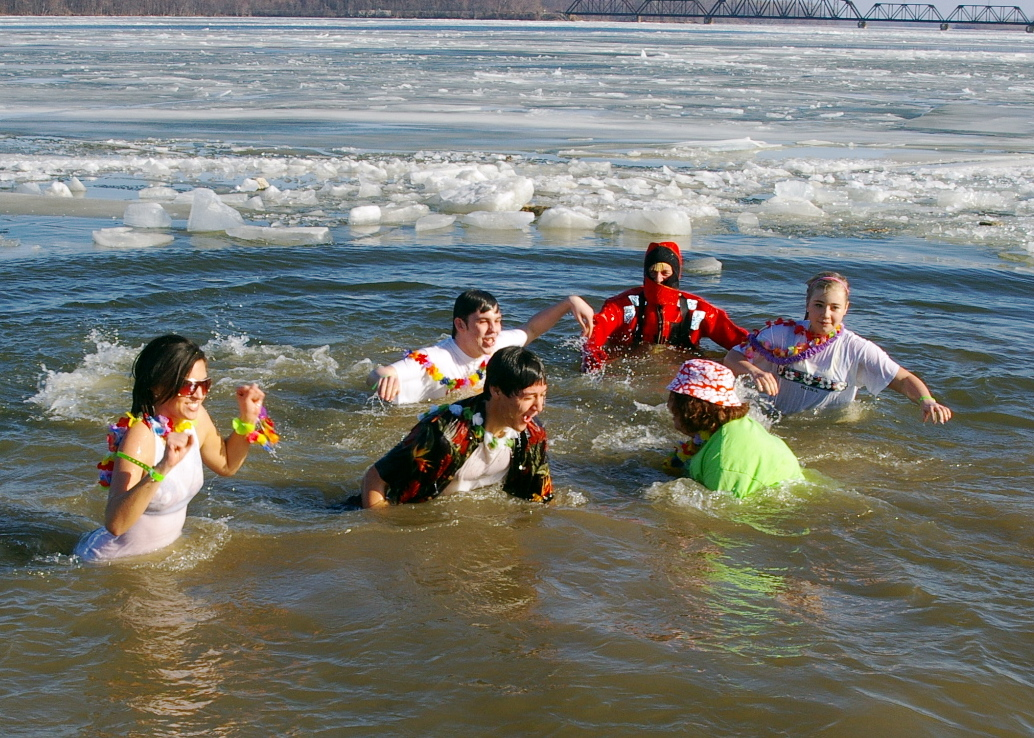
Participants in the water during a polar bear plunge when there is ice on the water.

A polar bear plunge is an event held during the winter where participants enter a body of water despite the low temperature. In the United States, polar bear plunges are usually held to raise money for a charitable organization. In Canada, polar bear swims are usually held on New Year's Day to celebrate the new year.

== Canada ==
In Canada, "Polar Bear Swims", "plunges" or "dips" are a New Year's Day tradition in numerous communities across the country. Vancouver, British Columbia's annual Polar Bear Swim Club has been active since 1920 and typically has 1,000 to 2,000 registered participants, with a record 2,128 plunging into English Bay in 2000. Registration is not enforced and the actual number of swimmers may be significantly higher. Estimates of the number of observers are typically up to 10,000. White Rock, British Columbia's Polar Bear Swim Club was founded in 1958, and other suburbs including North Vancouver, Surrey, Delta and Langley also hold swims.

Other locations include Bowen Island, BC, Sidney, BC, Edmonton, AB, Calgary, AB, Ottawa, ON, Oakville, ON, Toronto, ON, Perth, ON, Clarington, ON, Sarnia, ON, Montreal, QC, North Hatley, QC, Halifax, NS, Prince Edward Island, Ness Lake north of Prince George, BC and St. John's, NL. In Yellowknife, NWT, the "Freezin' for a reason" plunge is held in May after the spring thaw.

== Netherlands ==
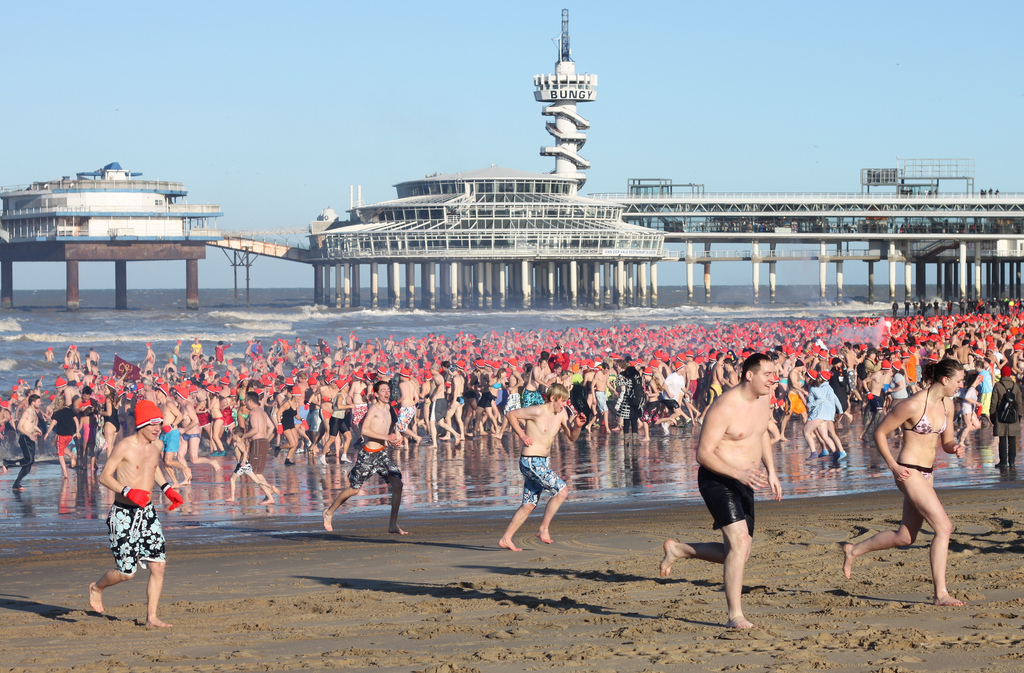
The Nieuwjaarsduik in Scheveningen (2010)

Every New Year's Day around 60,000 people dive collectively into the icy cold sea water at Scheveningen, a Dutch beach resort town, since 1960. In 89 locations on beaches and in lakes all over the country, each year many people participate in this "Nieuwjaarsduik" (English: New Year's dive). Since 1998, Unox, a Unilever food brand often associated with winter, adopted the Nieuwjaarsduik; Unox-branded winter caps and gloves are frequently worn by participants.

== New Zealand ==
Polar plunges (the local name) are held at various beaches in New Zealand, usually on the weekend closest to the shortest day in late June. Among other places, polar plunges are led at Papamoa Beach (Tauranga), Saint Clair Beach (Dunedin), and Castlecliff (Wanganui).

== United Kingdom ==
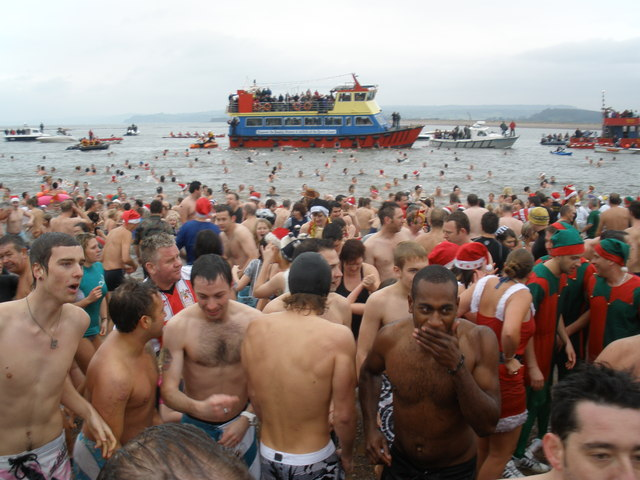
Christmas's Day swim at Exmouth

In the UK, the majority of winter swimming events take place on Christmas Day or Boxing Day, with many hundreds of people swimming in the sea at the largest events in Exmouth, Lowestoft and Brighton.

An annual "Loony Dook" takes place in South Queensferry, Scotland, on New Year's Day. Several thousand attend the event with over one thousand taking the plunge. Participants regularly dress up for the occasion and will usually parade through the local town acting like "loonies" proceeding the "dook". Aside from the regular enthusiasts, most are still inebriated from New Year's Eve celebrations and have more than likely lost a bet.

Another, smaller plunge occurs on Christmas Day at Blackroot Pool in Sutton Park, Birmingham, England. Often, participants aim to raise money for charity.

There is a Christmas Day Harbour Swim in Weymouth, Dorset.

In the British Overseas Territory of Gibraltar, an annual swim is held on Boxing Day.

Since the event's inauguration in 1983, thousands of people have taken part in the annual New Year's Day Dip on the Isle of Man, a British Crown Dependency. Events are held in Peel, Laxey, Douglas, Port St Mary, Ramsey and Castletown for various charities.

== United States ==
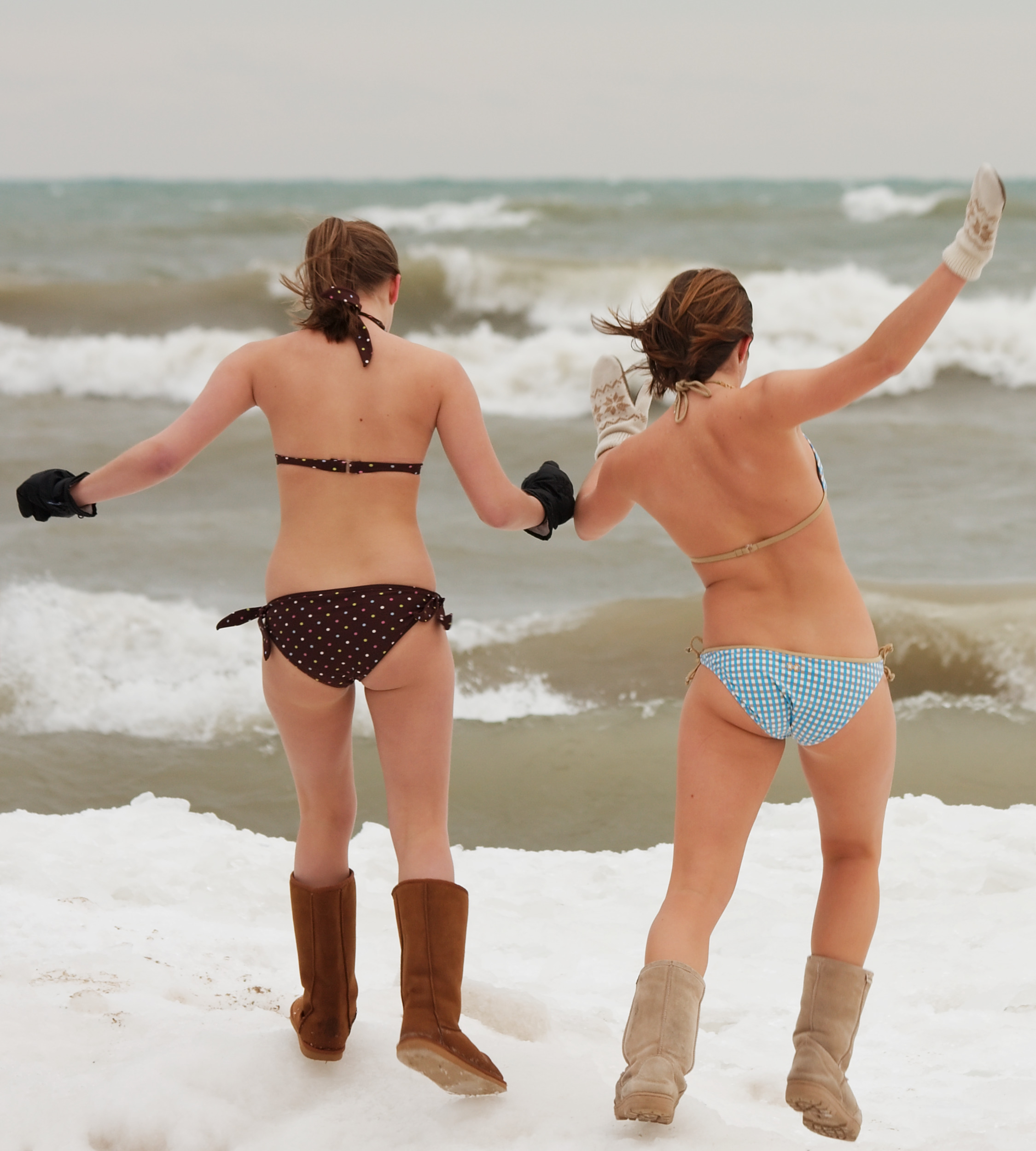
Two women prepare to enter the water in Milwaukee

Polar plunges are held across the United States, including annual events held in Seattle (since 1993); Evergreen, Colorado; New York (the Coney Island Polar Bear Club); Lake George, NY; Boston (since 1904); Milwaukee's Bradford Beach (since 1916); New Hampshire; and New Jersey. Some, such as Minnesota's, are held to raise proceeds for the Special Olympics. Geisel School of Medicine at Dartmouth College also organizes an annual "Polar Plunge for Health Equity" into Occom Pond. There is also one done by the restaurant Florabama which as the name implies is on the Florida-Alabama state line in the Perdido Key.

The Polar Bear Plunge event in Maryland is the largest polar bear plunge in the United States. It is held annually at Sandy Point State Park and raises funds for the Special Olympics. Sponsored by the Maryland State Police, in 2007, Plungapalooza raised $2.2 million and had 7,400 participants. In 2008, an estimated 12,000 people participated.

Every Super Bowl Sunday, Long Beach, New York, hosts one of the largest plunge events in the United States. Since 1998, thousands have flocked to Long Beach to jump into the ocean on Super Bowl Sunday. All proceeds are donated to the Make-A-Wish Foundation.

From February to March each year, Polar Plunges are held in numerous locations throughout the state of Illinois. Donations and proceeds raised for the Special Olympics.

== South Korea ==
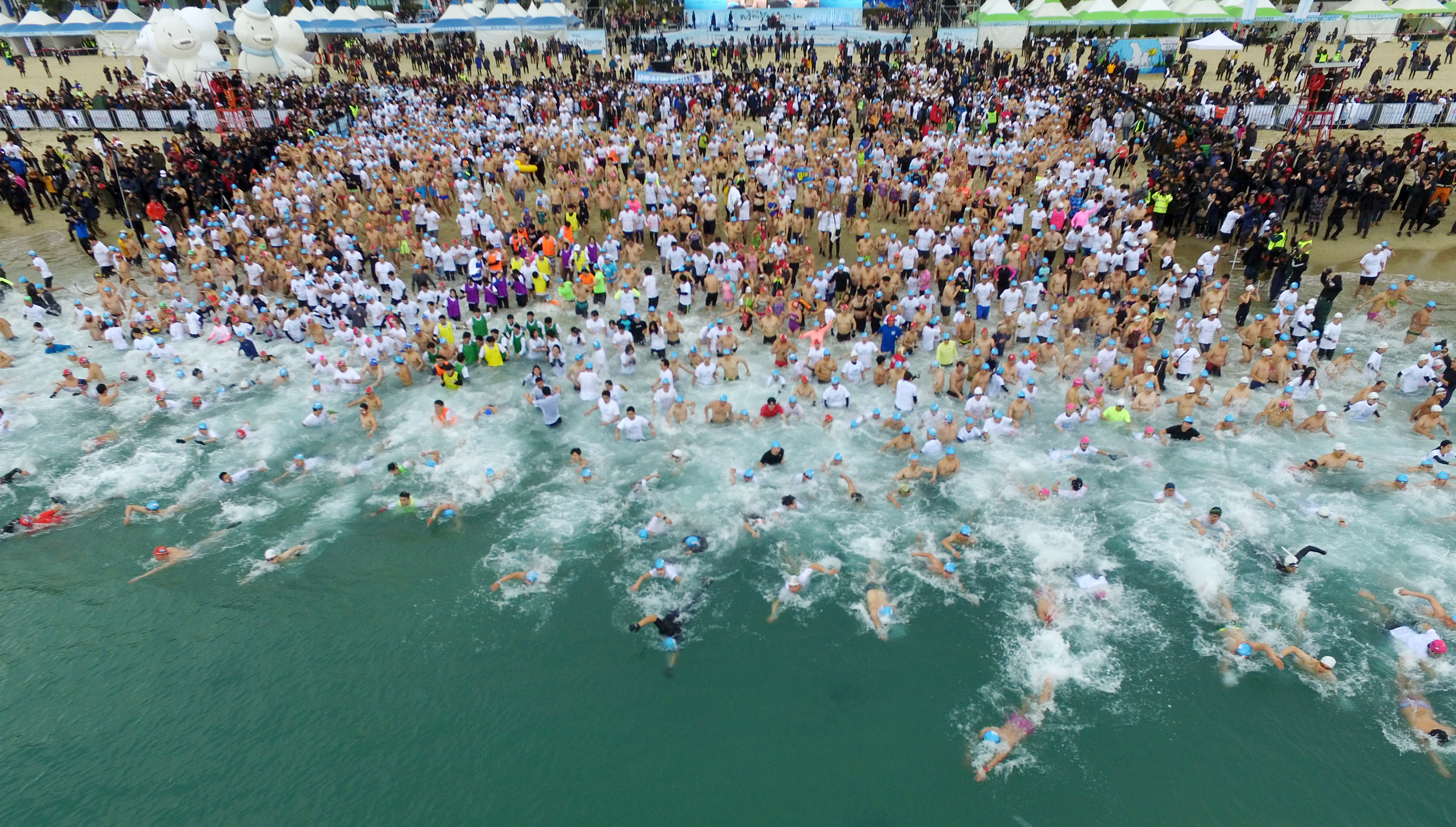
Busan Polar Bear Swimming Contest in Busan, South Korea

An annual Polar Bear Swimming Contest takes place annually at the Haeundae Beach in Busan, South Korea.

== Antarctica ==
A polar plunge is also held every midsummer in Antarctica as a rite of passage for scientists and visitors to New Zealand's Scott Base. It is held in late December.

== See also ==
- Ice swimming
- Ice bath
- Ice bucket challenge
- Twelve-dish Christmas Eve supper, a European tradition that sometimes includes swimming in the winter
- Winter swimming
