= Winter swimming =

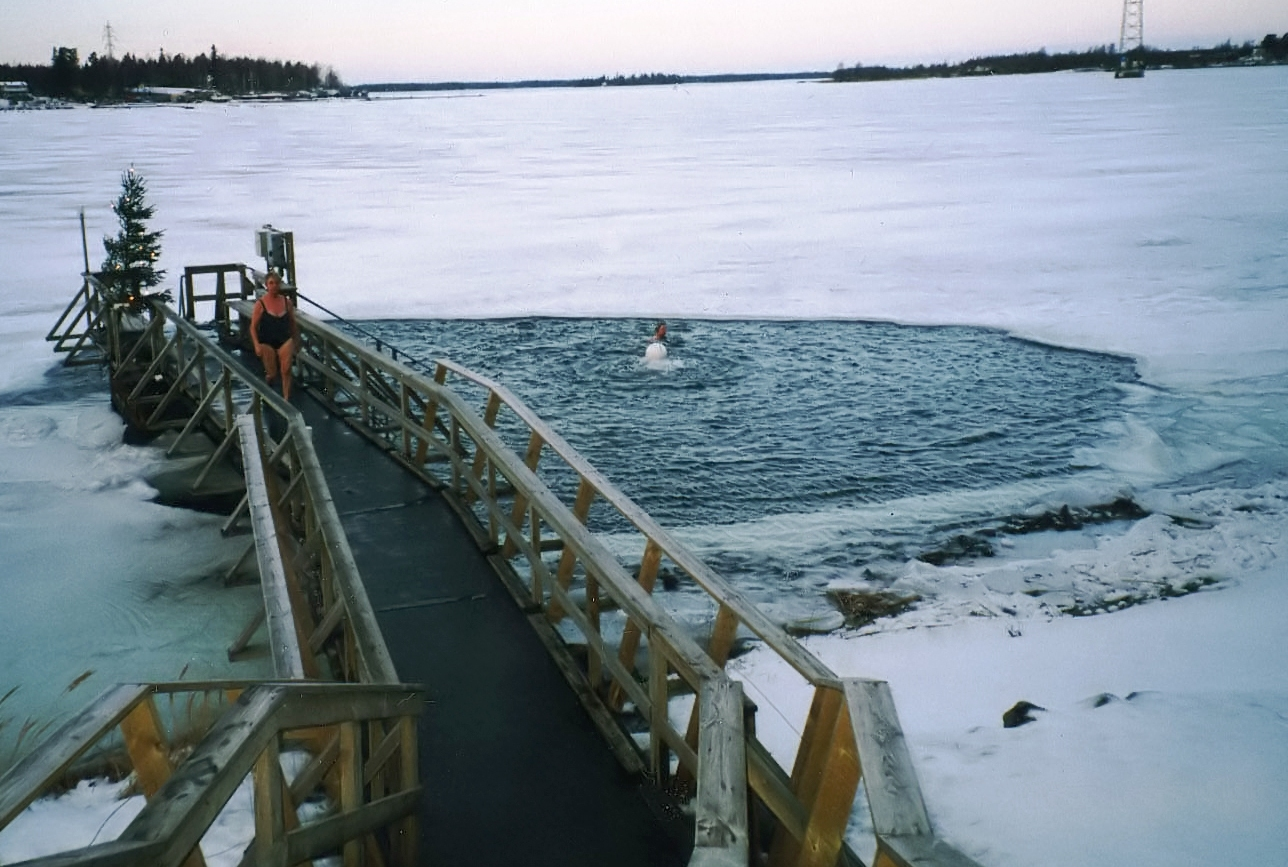
Ice swimming in Finland

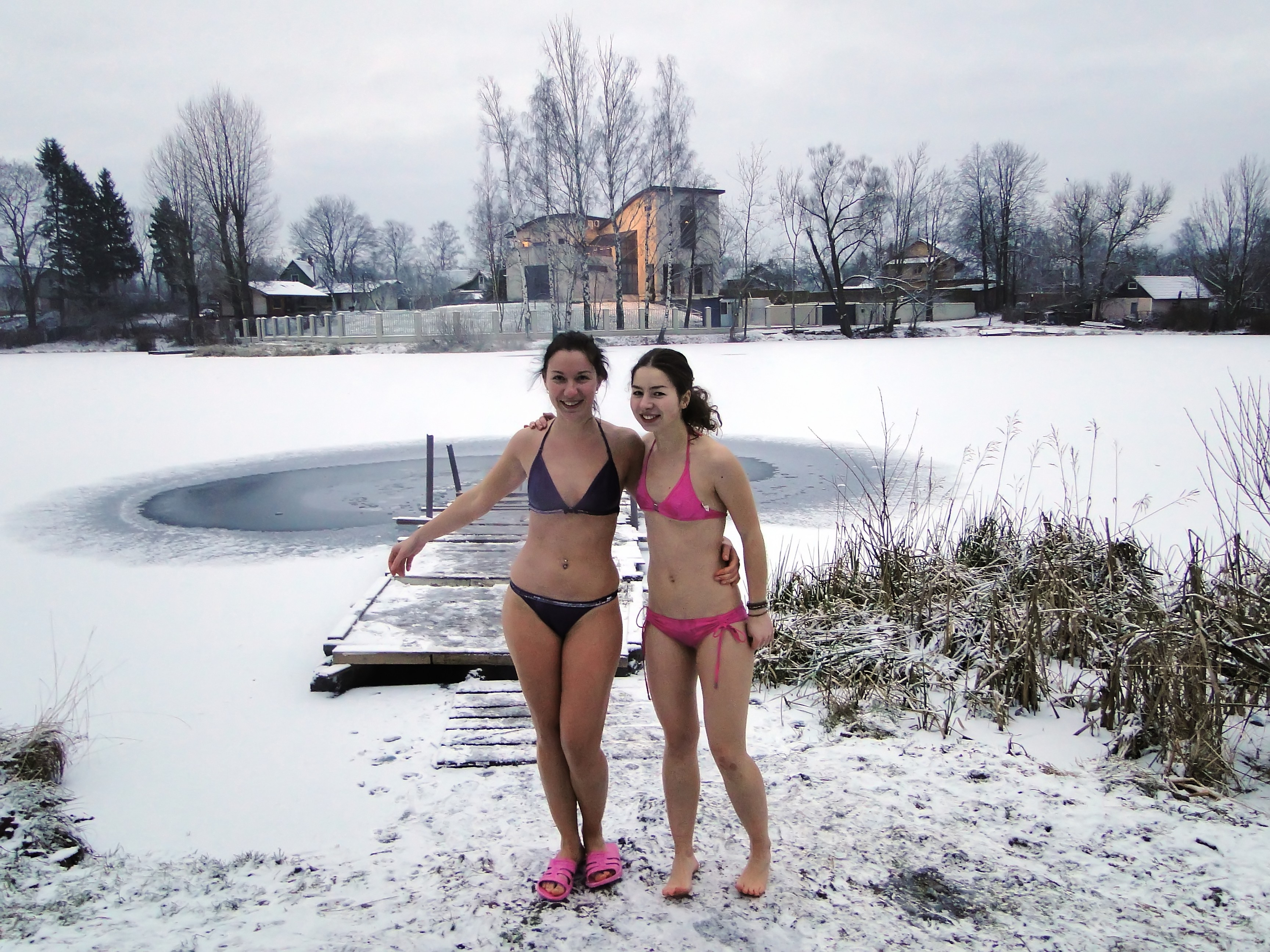
Two Russian women about to swim in a frozen lake

Winter swimming is the activity of swimming during the winter season, typically in outdoor locations (open water swimming) or in unheated pools or lidos. In colder countries, it may be synonymous with ice swimming, when the water is frozen over. This requires either breaking the ice or entering where a spring prevents the formation of ice. It may also be simulated by a pool of water at 0 °C (32 °F), the temperature at which water freezes.

In Nordic countries of Europe as well in Eastern Europe (e.g. Ukraine, Russia, and Baltic countries), winter swimming is a traditional cultural element and part of religious celebrations like the Epiphany in Eastern Orthodoxy.

Competitions for winter swimming also exist. Many winter swimmers swim with standard swimsuits rather than with wetsuits or other thermal protection. Famous ice and winter swimmers include Lynne Cox, Lewis Gordon Pugh, Bengisu Avcı and Egor Tropeano.

Also, many locations in North America and Europe hold polar bear plunges, commonly to celebrate New Year's Day, although participants are not expected to swim and generally most do not swim.

International winter and ice swimming competitions take place around the world with two of the larger organizing bodies being the International Ice Swimming Association and the International Winter Swimming Association. Both organizations have similar competition guidelines including water temperatures typically below 5 °C (41 °F), a 25 metres (82 ft) pool often cut out of frozen bodies of water, and swimmers limited to goggles, one standard bathing suit, and one latex or silicone cap - neoprene is not allowed.

== Maintaining the hole in the ice ==
One way that the hole is maintained at regular ice swimming places is with a pump that forces the water to circulate under the hole, preventing ice from forming. Small ice-holes can also be kept open by keeping a lid/top over the hole to prevent ice forming.

Most ice swimming places also use a specific heated "carpet" going from the locker rooms to the ice-hole, both to make walking to the hole more pleasant and for safety as otherwise the water dripping from returning swimmers would freeze and create a dangerously slippery surface to walk on.

== National traditions ==
=== Northern Europe ===
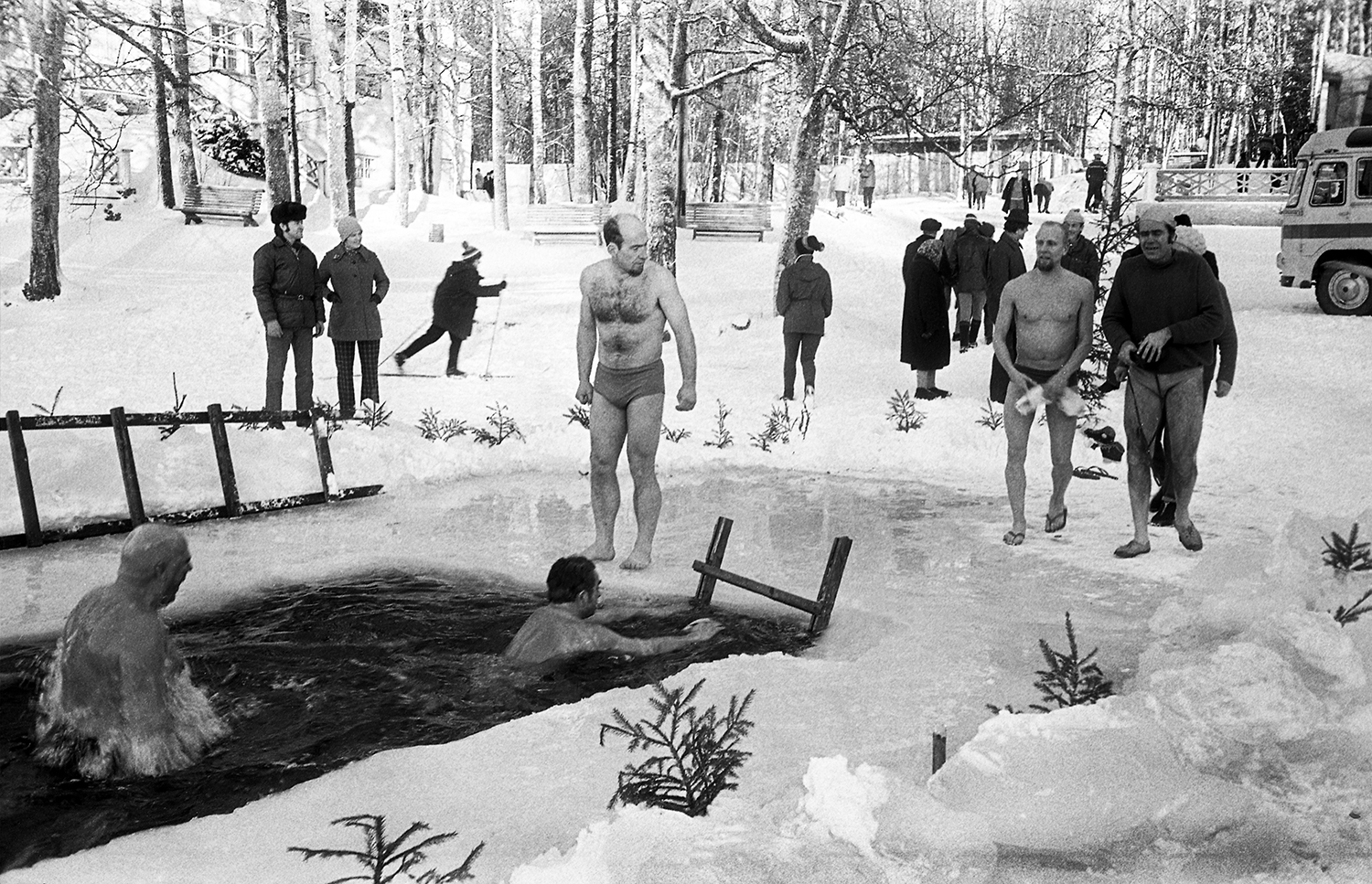
Ice swimming in Estonia in 1972

In Denmark, Estonia, Poland, Finland, Latvia, Lithuania, Norway, Russia and Sweden, the ice swimming tradition has been connected with the sauna and banya traditions. Unlike dousing, it is not seen as an ascetic or religious ritual, but a way to cool off rapidly after staying in a sauna and as a stress relief.

=== Oceania ===
==== Australia ====
In Victoria, Australia, the Brighton Icebergers swim in Port Phillip Bay.

=== Western Europe ===
In Germany, the International Ice Swimming Association hosts an official ice swimming event at the Wöhrsee, a lake in Burghausen.

In Geneva, Switzerland, the yearly Coupe de Noël is an event organized in December since 1934. Around 2,500 participants, many of them dressed up, swim 120 metres (390 ft) in Lake Geneva.

=== Central Europe ===
==== Poland ====
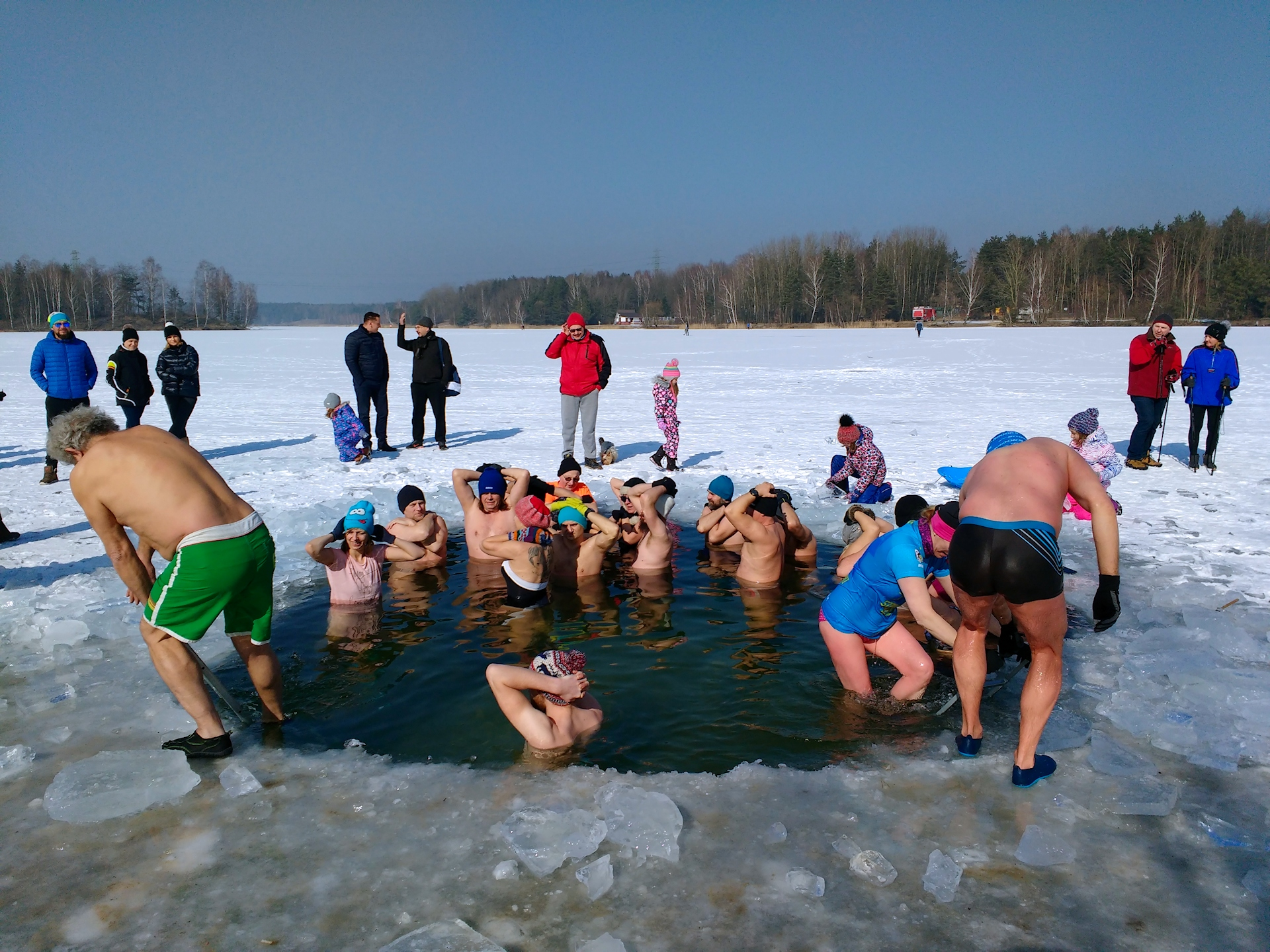
Swimming in ice hole in Chechło-Nakło reservoir in Poland

The history of winter swimming (pływanie w zimie) in Poland dates back to at least the 16th century, when Wojciech Oczko, the physician to the Kings Stephen Báthory and Sigismund III Vasa, published a treatise called Cieplice, which contained the information on the contemporary understanding of water-based therapies, including the indications and contraindications to ice swimming, swimming in ice holes, in ice cold temperatures.

=== Eastern Europe and Russia ===
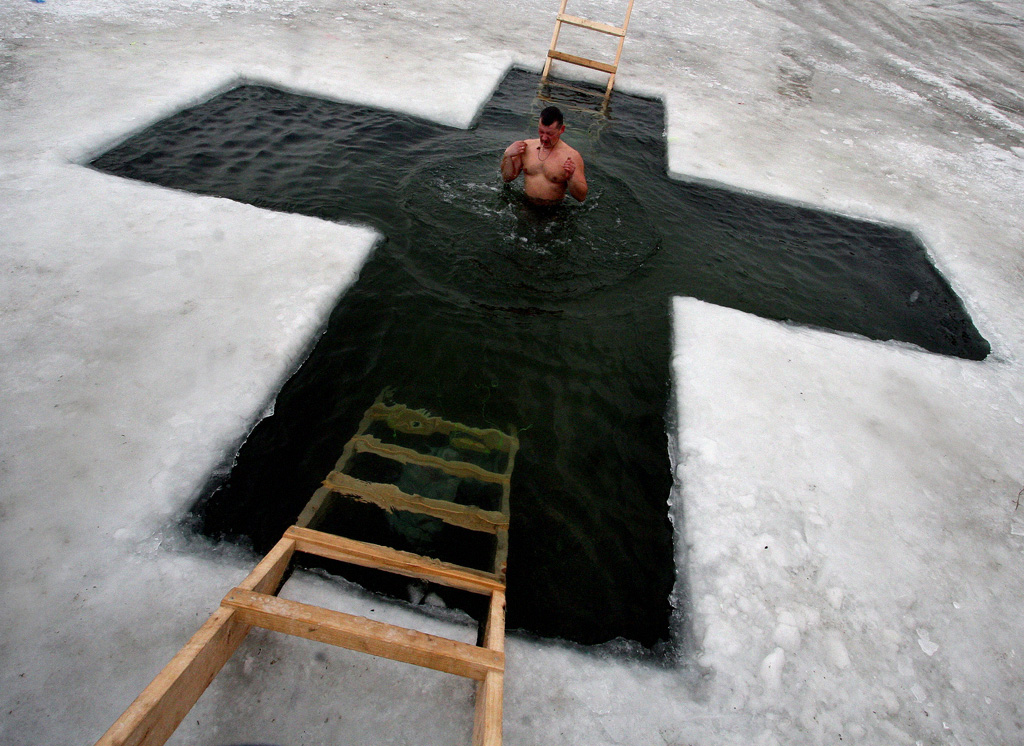
An ice hole is cut in the form of a cross in Russia to celebrate the Epiphany.

In Russia, ice swimming may have been practiced since pagan times. During the period of Muscovite Russia, swimming in ice holes was a popular tradition. Records are dating the tradition back to as early as 1525. It was also an important court ceremony and a folk custom in the tsarist period.

In the Eastern Orthodox Christianity, ice swimming is connected with the celebration of the Epiphany. The Epiphany is observed on 19 January according to the Julian calendar of the Russian Orthodox Church and marks the baptism of Jesus in the River Jordan. To celebrate this, holes are cut in the ice on rivers, lakes or other bodies of water, usually in the form of a Christian or Orthodox cross. Around midnight, believers submerge themselves three times in the water to honour the Holy Trinity, after a priest says a prayer.

Ice swimming on the Epiphany is relatively new. It was practised by only a few before the October Revolution of 1917 and occurred even less frequently in the time of the Soviet Union, when Christians were persecuted. However, the ritual became very popular in the 1990s since the Dissolution of the Soviet Union. In Moscow alone, 30,000 believers swam in ice holes during the Epiphany of 2010. There is a popular belief that the practice erases a person's sins, but this is not endorsed by the Russian Orthodox Church. The ritual is also performed in Belarus, Ukraine, Kazakhstan and Kyrgyzstan. On the holiday in January 2020, 2 million people practised ice swimming in Russia for the baptism of Jesus.

Ice swimming is also practised during the entire winter by Walrus Clubs, whose members are called "walruses" (Russian: моржи, "morzhi"). In other Eastern European countries such as Bulgaria and Romania, the Epiphany is celebrated on 6 January. There it is tradition for Orthodox priests to cast wooden crosses in the water, which are then retrieved by the believers. It is popularly believed that the person who finds the cross is freed from evil spirits. Other countries where this is done include Serbia and Montenegro.

=== North America ===
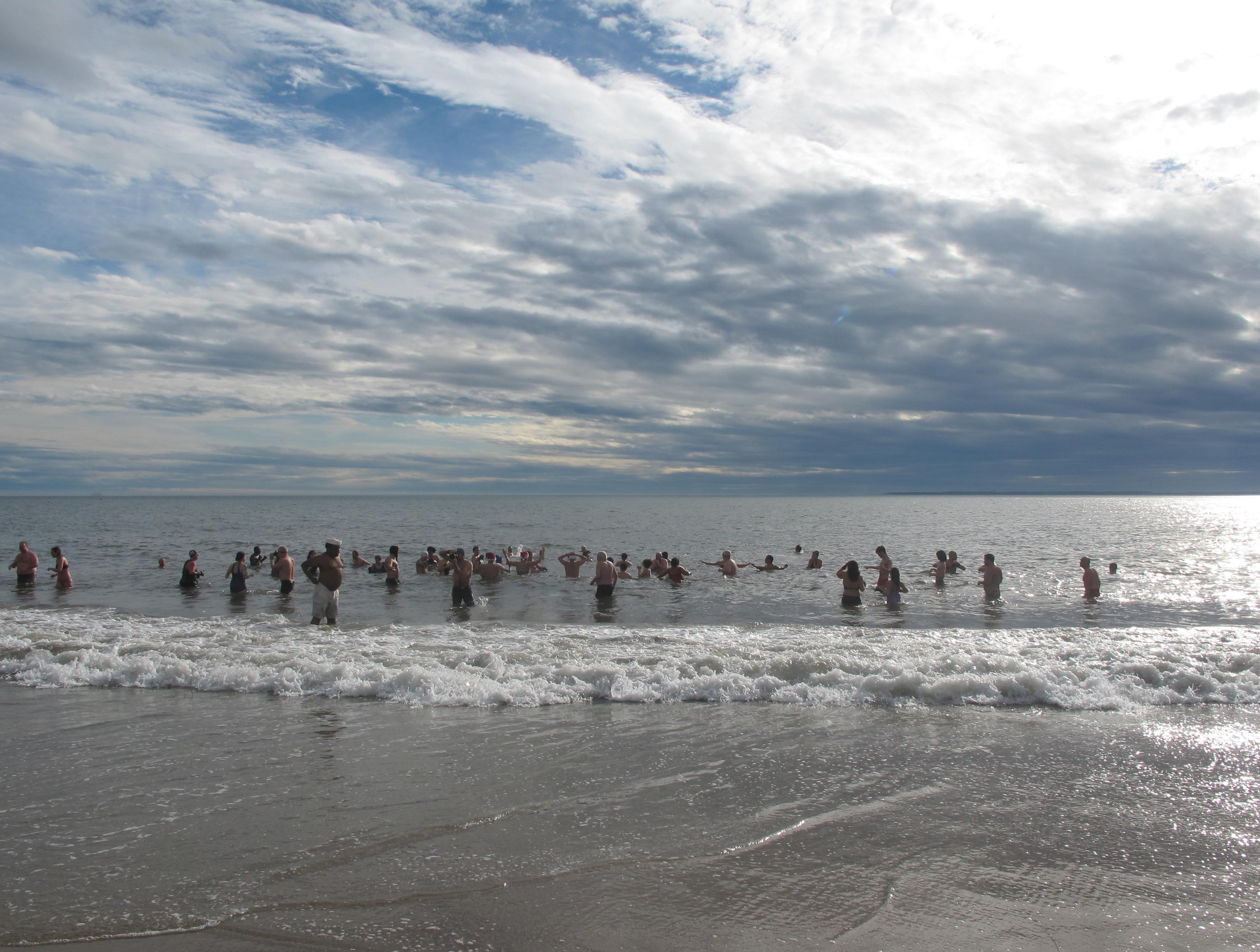
The Coney Island Polar Bears club in the water on 22 December 2013

The members of Canadian and American "polar bear clubs" go outdoor bathing or swimming in the middle of winter. In some areas, it is unusual or ceremonial enough to attract press coverage. "Polar bear plunges" are conducted as fund-raisers for charity, notably the Special Olympics, however these events do not actually involve swimming, but rather running into the water and back out again.

The Russian immigrant professor Louis Sugarman of Little Falls, NY was the first American to become a famous ice swimmer in the 1890s. He attracted worldwide attention for his daily plunge in the Mohawk River, even when the thermometer hit −23 °F (−31 °C), earning him the nickname "the human polar bear".

The oldest ice swimming club in the United States is the Coney Island Polar Bear Club of Coney Island, New York, founded in 1903. The club organizes an annual polar plunge on New Year's Day as well as regular swims in the Atlantic Ocean every Sunday from November to April.

=== Asia ===
==== China ====
Jinan is also the site of annual Chinese national winter swimming festivals since 2014, as an international invitational festival (in 2019 attended by approx. 990 winter swimmers from 12 countries, still according Chinese rules) since 2016, and, from season 2019/2020, as the International Winter Swimming Association (IWSA) 3rd stage of World Cup already according to IWSA international rules.

== Health risks ==
Winter swimming can be dangerous to people who are not used to swimming in very cold water. After immersion in cold water the cold shock response will occur, causing an uncontrollable gasp for air. This is followed by hyperventilation, a longer period of more rapid breathing. The gasp for air can cause a person to ingest water, which leads to drowning. As blood in the limbs is cooled and returns to the heart, this can cause fibrillation and consequently cardiac arrest. The cold shock response and cardiac arrest are the most common causes of death related to cold water immersion.

Winter swimming is not dangerous for healthy persons, but experts advise that it be avoided by individuals with heart or respiratory diseases, high blood pressure and arrhythmia, as well as children and the elderly. Through conditioning, experienced winter swimmers have a greater resistance to effects of the cold shock response.

Hypothermia poses a smaller risk. According to Tucker and Dugas, it takes more than approximately 30 minutes even in 0 °C (32 °F) water until the body temperature drops low enough for hypothermia to occur. Many people would probably be able to survive for almost an hour. There is no consensus on these figures however; according to different estimates a person can survive for 45 minutes in 0.3 °C (32.5 °F) water, but exhaustion or unconsciousness is expected to occur within 15 minutes. Consuming alcohol before winter swimming is also ill-advised because it speeds the onset and progression of hypothermia.

Experts recommend that care be taken when winter swimming in swimming pools and seas near the polar regions. The chlorine added to water in swimming pools and the salt in seawater allow the water to remain liquid at sub-zero temperatures. Swimming in such water is significantly more challenging and dangerous. The experienced winter swimmer Lewis Gordon Pugh swam near the North Pole in −1.7 °C (28.9 °F) water and suffered a frostbite injury in his fingers. It took him four months to regain sensation in his hands.

== Health benefits ==
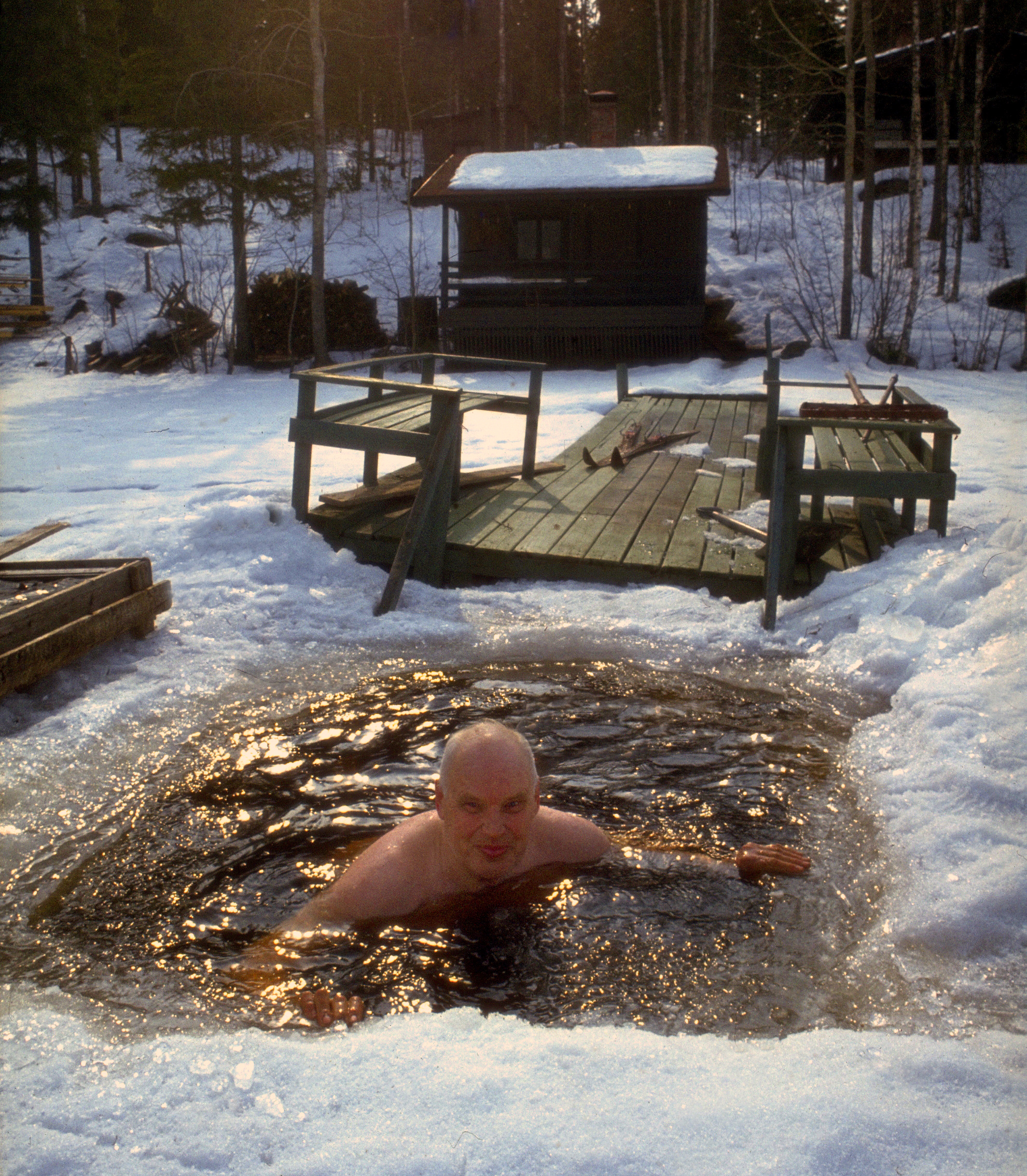
Man smiling to camera while ice swimming at a summer cottage in Finland

Exposure to cold water has been advocated as a treatment for multiple health conditions since at least the early 19th century. Although there are risks associated with the practice, scientific studies also provide some evidence for the following health benefits.

When compared to a control group on the profile of mood states rating scale, winter swimmers experience less stress and fatigue and more vigor. They report to have a better memory function, better mood and feel more energetic, active and brisk. Swimmers who suffer from rheumatism, fibromyalgia or asthma report that winter swimming relieves pain.

There are indications that winter swimmers do not contract diseases as often as the general population. The incidence of infectious diseases affecting the upper respiratory tract is 40% lower among winter swimmers when compared to a control group. Short term exposure of the whole body to cold water produces oxidative stress, which makes winter swimmers develop improved antioxidative protection.

== See also ==
- Apetor
- Ice bath
- Boxing Day Dip
- Cold water dousing
- Polar bear plunge
- Stunt swimming
- Wim Hof
- Epiphany bathing
