= Union of Moscow Architects =

- Formation: 1867
- Type: Non-profit organization
- Purpose: Architecture
- Location: Moscow, Russia
- Website: http://moscowarch.ru
- Formerly called: Russian: Союз московских архитекторов (СМА)

The Union of Moscow Architects (UMA) is a nonprofit organization of more than four thousand architects of the city of Moscow and the surrounding region. UMA's objectives are the promotion of the development of national architecture and urban planning, giving assistance in the protection of the architectural, historical and cultural heritage, elaboration of international cooperation, integration of Russian architects in the world cultural community. One of UMA's main priorities is the progress of a dialogue between society and architectural professional corporation for joint working out of the new ways for the development and improvement of the urban environment. The headquarters of the Union of Moscow Architects is the Central House of Architects, which is also the main venue for various cultural and educational activities.
