= North Sea Volunteer Lifeguards =

Volunteer lifeguard club based in Tynemouth, Tyne and Wear, England

North Sea Volunteer Lifeguards (commonly abbreviated to NSVL) is a volunteer lifeguard club based in Tynemouth, North Tyneside, Tyne and Wear, England. It was founded in 1998, and has since become one of the largest lifeguard clubs in the UK with over 250 members from age 6 to 66. It is affiliated to the Royal Life Saving Society UK, but is also a charity in its own right, registered with the Charity Commission.

It offers the full range of Royal Life Saving Society UK programmes and awards, and also some programmes affiliated to other organisations, such as the Heartstart programme which is co-ordinated by the British Heart Foundation. Its main focus is the beach lifeguard qualification, indeed in 2002 it was responsible for over 10% of all the beach lifeguard awards taken in the United Kingdom.

The club has regular training sessions throughout the year, training in the North Sea from its headquarters on Tynemouth Longsands and also at Tynemouth Pool.

NSVL is run by a committee of 10 club members, who are elected at the Annual General Meeting. However other club members play an important role in running the club, for example by teaching for courses and awards.
