= Epiphany bathing =

Christian tradition of ritual bathing during the feast of Epiphany

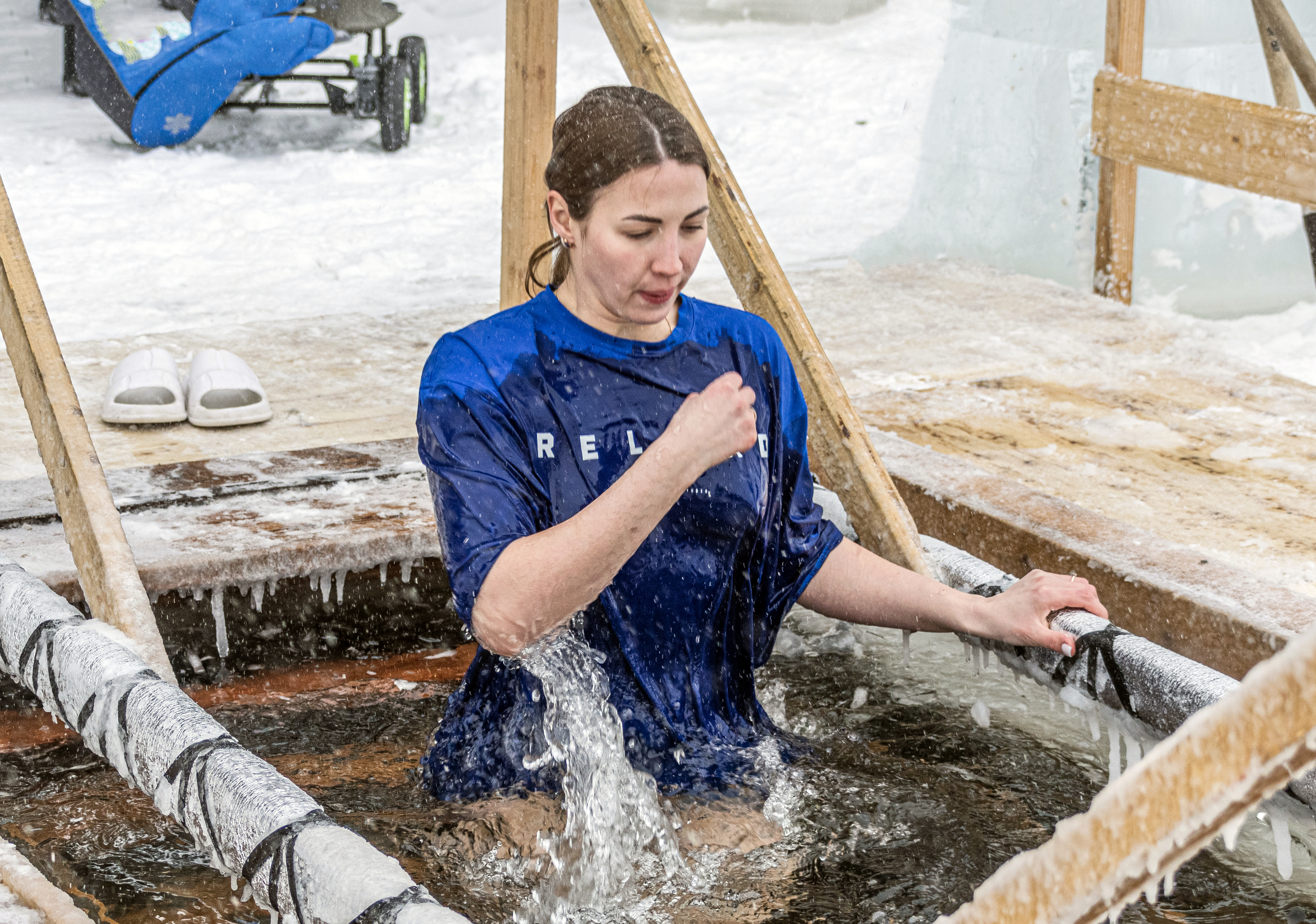
Bathing in an ice font on the feast of the Epiphany

Epiphany bathing is a Christian practice associated with the Feast of Epiphany and is most widely practiced in Eastern Orthodox countries. In Russia, Ukraine, and other parts of Eastern Europe, worshipers mark the day by plunging into icy rivers, lakes, or holes cut in the ice, recalling the Baptism of Jesus in the Jordan River.

== Origins and symbolism ==
The bathing tradition derives from Christian commemorations of the baptism of Jesus by John the Baptist. Bathing in the cold, blessed water is seen as a way to purify the soul and renew one’s faith.

== Regional traditions ==
=== Russia and Eastern Europe ===
In Russia, thousands of ice holes, known as Iordan (after the Jordan River), are cut into frozen rivers and lakes. Believers immerse themselves three times, invoking the Holy Trinity.

While millions participate, the Russian Orthodox Church emphasizes that Epiphany bathing is a popular tradition, not a sacrament, and is not required of believers.

=== Greece and the Balkans ===
In Greece, Bulgaria, and other Balkan states, priests bless local waters and cast a wooden cross into rivers or the sea. Young men dive in to retrieve it, and the finder is considered blessed for the coming year.

=== Middle East ===
At the traditional baptism site along the Jordan River in Jordan and Israel, Christian pilgrims mark Epiphany with immersion rites and processions, reenacting the baptism of Jesus.

== Contemporary practice ==
In modern times, Epiphany bathing has become a part of the broader culture, and sometimes non-orthodox individuals also take part in the event. The event often attracts media attention.

Public health authorities regularly warn about the risks of hypothermia, heart strain, and other accidents during the bathing, especially for those with preexisting medical conditions.

== See also ==
- Feast of Epiphany
- Baptism of Jesus
- Water and religion
- Baptism
