= Andy Donaldson (swimmer) =

Scottish swimmer

Andrew Alan Donaldson
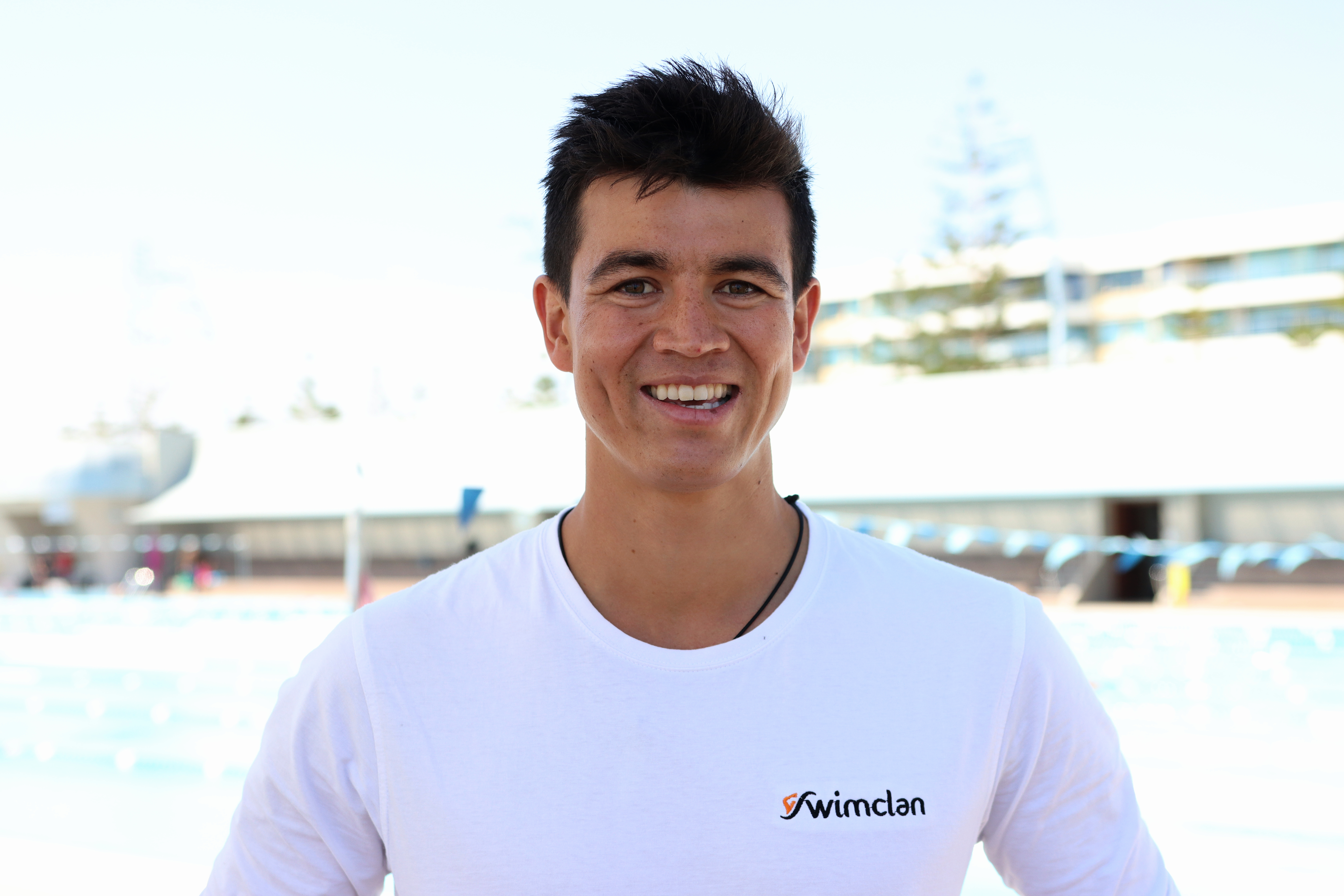

Personal information
- Nationality: British-Australian
- Born: 10 February 1991 (age 35) Irvine, Scotland, UK

Sport
- Country: Great Britain
- Sport: Marathon Swimming
- Club: City of Perth Swimming Club
- Coached by: Eoin Carroll, Ryan Evernden

Andrew Donaldson (born 10 February 1991) is a Scottish-Australian marathon swimmer and advocate for mental health, ocean conservation, and water safety.

He is the first person to complete the Oceans Seven marathon swimming challenge within a single year and has broken multiple world records, including for the circumnavigation of Manhattan Island and the Cook Strait crossing between New Zealand's North and South Islands.

In 2023, Donaldson was named World Open Water Swimming Association Man of the Year and received the organisation's Performance of the Year award. In 2026, he was inducted into the International Marathon Swimming Hall of Fame.

== Early life and career ==
Donaldson was born in Irvine, North Ayrshire, Scotland, to a Scottish father and an Indonesian Mother. He grew up in West Kilbride and started swimming with the North Ayrshire Amateur Swimming Club at age seven. He attended Largs Academy for secondary school before graduating from Loughborough University in 2012.

In 2013, he relocated to Perth, Western Australia where he pursued professional swimming before later working in accounting and finance.

After missing selection for major international teams, Donaldson retired from competitive swimming in 2016. During this period, he experienced mental health challenges while completing his Chartered Accounting studies and working in finance. He later took a career break to travel overseas and during the early stages of the COVID-19 pandemic, worked as a volcano tour guide in Nicaragua.

Donaldson returned to Perth in 2020 and resumed swimming to improve his physical and mental well-being. There, he co-founded Swimclan with Martin Smoothy to help adults improve their swimming, health, and confidence in the water.

In 2021, Donaldson returned to competitive marathon swimming by winning the 19.7 km Rottnest Channel Swim in Western Australia. In 2022, he set a course record in Tasmania's 33.5 km Derwent River Big Swim and won the 24 km Palm Beach to Shelly Beach Swim in Sydney.

=== Oceans Seven ===
In August 2022, Donaldson announced his goal of completing the Oceans Seven challenge within a single calendar year. He completed the challenge in 355 days, becoming the first person to achieve the feat within one calendar year while setting multiple national and world records.

The campaign also raised funds and awareness for the Black Dog Institute and mental health initiatives.

Donaldson began his challenge by swimming the English Channel in 8 hours, setting a new British record. He later became the first Scottish male to complete a solo swim of the North Channel, from Ireland to Scotland.

In March 2023, he set a new world record for New Zealand's Cook Strait crossing, completing the 22 km swim in 4 hours, 33 minutes and 50 seconds.

During the campaign, Donaldson encountered difficult environmental conditions, logistical challenges and physical exhaustion. Following his crossing of Hawaii's Molokai Channel (Kaiwi Channel), he was hospitalised due to severe throat swelling. Despite this, he continued the campaign and later set British records for both the Strait of Gibraltar and Catalina Channel crossings.

Donaldson completed the Oceans Seven challenge in July 2023 after successfully crossing Japan's Tsugaru Strait.

Swims of the Oceans Seven
Date	Swim	Route	Distance	Time	Remarks
2022-08-07	English Channel	England to France	33 km	08:00:00	British record
2022-09-19	North Channel	Ireland to Scotland	34.5 km	09:13:57	British record
2023-03-07	Cook Strait	South Island to North Island (New Zealand)	22 km	04:33:50	World record
2023-04-18	Kaiwi Channel	Molokai to Oahu (USA)	45 km	15:51:00	
2023-05-20	Strait of Gibraltar	Spain to Morocco	14.4 km	02:56:00	British record
2023-07-11	Catalina Channel	Catalina Island to Los Angeles (USA)	32.3 km	09:22:52	British record
2023-07-27	Tsugaru Strait	Honshu to Hokkaido (Japan)	19.5 km	13:04:30	

=== Later Marathon Swims ===
In July 2024, Donaldson participated in the inaugural Epic Swim Maui expedition, completing the 220 km circumnavigation of Maui over 14 days alongside a team of international marathon swimmers. The event was organised to promote awareness of ocean health and sustainability.

On 18 September 2024, Donaldson broke the world record for the circumnavigation of Manhattan Island, completing the 45.9 km swim in 5 hours, 41 minutes, and 48 seconds, a record that stood to June 2025. With the Manhattan swim, he also completed the Triple Crown of Open Water Swimming.

In April 2025, he was part of a four-person relay that swam non-stop around Bahrain, covering 170 km in 59 hours and 59 minutes, a time recognised by Guinness World Records as the fastest relay swim around the country.

In October 2025, he and German swimm Nathalie Pohl completed a two-person relay around Ibiza, covering 104 km in 30 hours and 57 minutes.

In April 2026, Donaldson completed the 55 km Ord River Dam to Dam swim in Western Australia's Kimberley region, swimming from Lake Argyle Dam to Swim Beach near Kununurra's Diversion Dam in 11 hours, 51 minutes and 27 seconds, setting a new course record. Media coverage of the swim highlighted the logistical and environmental challenges of the route, including the presence of freshwater crocodiles.

=== Charity Work and Advocacy ===
Donaldson is an advocate for mental health, the oceans, and water safety. Many of his marathon swims have supported charitable and community initiatives.

His Oceans Seven campaign raised funds for the Black Dog Institute, and he has supported mental health organisations including the Kai Eardley Foundation, of which he is an ambassador.

In October 2023, Donaldson completed a 33 km swim from Rottnest Island to Elizabeth Quay in Perth to raise funds for Telethon and youth mental health research at the Perron Institute for Neurological Science. He repeated this challenge in 2024 and 2025.

=== Awards and Recognition ===
- World Open Water Swimming Association - Man of the Year (2023)
- World Open Water Swimming Association - Performance of the Year (2023)
- International Marathon Swimming Hall of Fame - Honouree (2026)
- Health & Fitness Association Awards - Lifetime Achievement Award (2026)

=== Notable Swims and Achievements ===
Date	Swim	Route	Distance	Time	Remarks
2018-02-11	Busselton Jetty Swim	Around Busselton Jetty	3.6km	42:14	Solo Winner
2021-02-20	Rottnest Channel Swim	Cottesloe Beach to Rottnest Island (Australia)	19.7km	4:04:30	Solo Winner
2022-03-26	Derwent River Big Swim	New Norfolk Bridge to Tasman Bridge (Australia)	33.5km	5:35:21	Course Record
2022-04-09	Palm to Shelly Swim	Palm Beach to Shelly Beach (Australia)	24km	6:05:00	Solo Winner
2022-08-07	English Channel	England to France	33km	8:00:00	British Record
2022-09-19	North Channel	Ireland to Scotland	34.5km	9:13:57	British Record
2023-03-07	Cook Strait	South Island to North Island (New Zealand)	22km	4:33:50	World Record
2023-04-18	Kaiwi Channel	Molokai to Oahu (USA)	45km	15:51:00	
2023-05-20	Strait of Gibraltar	Spain to Morocco	14.4km	2:56:00	British Record
2023-07-11	Catalina Channel	Catalina Island to Los Angeles (USA)	32.3km	9:22:52	British Record
2023-07-27	Tsugaru Strait	Honshu to Hokkaido (Japan)	19.5km	13:04:30	
2023-10-22	Team Andy's Swim for Telethon	Rottnest Island to Elizabeth Quay (Swim-Run-Swim)	33.3km	N/A	
2024-07-07	Epic Swim Maui	Circumnavigation of Maui (USA)	220km	14 days	
2024-09-18	20 Bridges Manhattan Island Swim	Manhattan Circumnavigation CCW (USA)	45.9km	5:41:48	World Record
2024-10-07	UltraSwim 33.3 Ultimate	Lustica Bay to Lazure (Montenegro)	33.3km	10:04:06	
2024-10-20	Team Andy's Swim for Telethon	Rottnest Island to Elizabeth Quay (Swim-Run-Swim)	33.3km	N/A	
2025-02-13	World Islands Dubai	World Islands Circumnavigation CW (UAE)	24km	10:41:23	
2025-04-25	Bahrain Swim Challenge	Bahrain Circumnavigation CCW - Team of 4 Relay	170km	59:59:00	World Record
2025-10-03	Ibiza Swim Challenge	Ibiza Circumnavigation CW - Team of 2 Relay	104km	30:57:49	World Record
2025-10-19	Team Andy's Swim for Telethon	Rottnest Island to Elizabeth Quay (Swim-Run-Swim)	33.3km	N/A	
2026-03-21	Port to Pub Swim	Leighton Beach to Rottnest Island	25km	6:06:47	
2026-04-28	Ord River Dam to Dam Swim	Lake Argyle Dam to Kununurra Diversion Dam	55km	11:51:27	Course Record
