= Anshuman Jhingran =

Indian open-water swimmer (born 2005)

Personal information
- Nationality: Indian
- Born: 13 March 2005 (age 21) India

Sport
- Sport: Open-water swimming
- Coach: Gokul Kamath

Anshuman Jhingran

Anshuman Jhingran (born 13 March 2005) is an Indian open-water swimmer from Navi Mumbai, Maharashtra. He is known for completing the Oceans Seven, a series of seven major open-water channel crossings.

On 30 June 2026, Jhingran completed his seventh and final Oceans Seven crossing in the Tsugaru Strait in Japan. Guinness World Records recognizes him as the youngest male to complete the Oceans Seven, at the age of 21 years and 109 days. He is also the third Indian swimmer to complete the challenge, after Rohan More and Prabhat Koli.

In 2023, Jhingran became the youngest male swimmer to cross the North Channel, completing the crossing between Northern Ireland and Scotland in 11 hours, 28 minutes and 52 seconds at the age of 18 years and 126 days.

== Early life ==
Anshuman Jhingran grew up in Navi Mumbai, Maharashtra. He began swimming at an early age and initially competed as a pool swimmer. He trained at the Father Agnel Sports Centre in Vashi under coach Gokul Kamath. Moneycontrol reported that Jhingran began structured training with Kamath and Rutuja Udeshi in 2015.

Jhingran was a student of Karmaveer Bhaurao Patil College in Vashi. In 2023, while completing his Class 12 studies, he was reported as training at the Father Agnel swimming pool under Kamath.

During the COVID-19 pandemic, Jhingran suffered a bicycle accident that resulted in fractures to his forearm and wrist. During his recovery, Kamath introduced him to open-water swimming. Jhingran subsequently shifted his focus from competitive pool swimming to long-distance open-water swimming.

On 20 April 2022, at the age of 16, Jhingran crossed the Palk Strait between Sri Lanka and India in 9 hours and 47 minutes. The approximately 30-kilometre crossing was one of his early international open-water swimming achievements.

== Career ==
Jhingran began his career as a competitive pool swimmer before moving into long-distance open-water swimming. After suffering a hand injury in 2020, he shifted his focus towards endurance swimming and began training for long-distance sea crossings.

In December 2021, Jhingran completed a 36-kilometre swim from Dharamtar to the Gateway of India in Mumbai in 8 hours and 19 minutes. He also completed a 23-kilometre swim from Revas to the Gateway of India in November 2021.

On 17 July 2023, Jhingran crossed the North Channel from Northern Ireland to Scotland in 11 hours, 28 minutes and 52 seconds. At the age of 18 years and 126 days, he became the youngest male swimmer to complete the crossing.

On 30 August 2023, Jhingran crossed the Catalina Channel between Santa Catalina Island and the Southern California mainland in 8 hours, 38 minutes and 19 seconds.

On 18 January 2024, he completed the Cook Strait crossing in New Zealand in 6 hours, 58 minutes and 11 seconds.

Jhingran subsequently completed the Molokaʻi Channel in Hawaii on 5 October 2024, the Strait of Gibraltar on 9 May 2025, and the English Channel on 11 August 2025, completing the latter crossing in 15 hours and 49 minutes.

On 30 June 2026, Jhingran completed the Tsugaru Strait crossing in Japan in 11 hours, 37 minutes and 41 seconds, completing all seven Oceans Seven crossings. Guinness World Records recognized him as the youngest male to complete the Oceans Seven.

== Oceans Seven ==
The Oceans Seven is a marathon swimming challenge consisting of seven open-water channel crossings. Jhingran completed all seven crossings between July 2023 and June 2026.

No.	Channel	Date	Distance	Time
1	North Channel	17 July 2023	35 km	11:28:52
2	Catalina Channel	30 August 2023	32.3 km	8:38:19
3	Cook Strait	18 January 2024	23 km	6:58:11
4	Molokaʻi Channel	5 October 2024	42 km	14:21:00
5	Strait of Gibraltar	9 May 2025	14.4 km	3:51:00
6	English Channel	11 August 2025	33.8 km	15:49:00
7	Tsugaru Strait	30 June 2026	19.5 km	11:37:41

Jhingran completed the final crossing in the Tsugaru Strait between the Japanese islands of Honshu and Hokkaido on 30 June 2026. He was aged 21 years and 109 days at the time, making him the youngest male to complete the Oceans Seven according to Guinness World Records.

== Achievements and honors ==
- Youngest male to complete the Oceans Seven — On 30 June 2026, Jhingran completed the Oceans Seven at the age of 21 years and 109 days. Guinness World Records recognizes him as the youngest male to complete the challenge.
- Youngest male to swim the North Channel — On 17 July 2023, Jhingran crossed the North Channel from Northern Ireland to Scotland at the age of 18 years and 126 days, completing the crossing in 11 hours, 28 minutes and 52 seconds.
- Third Indian to complete the Oceans Seven — Jhingran became the third Indian swimmer to complete the Oceans Seven, following Rohan More and Prabhat Koli.

== See also ==
- Oceans Seven
- Open water swimming
- Marathon swimming
- English Channel
- North Channel (British Isles)
- Tsugaru Strait
