= Sayani Das =

Indian swimmer

Personal information
- Nationality: Indian
- Born: 27 April 1998 Purba Bardhaman district, West Bengal, India
- Occupation: Open-water swimmer

Sport
- Sport: Open-water swimming

Sayani Das (born 27 April 1998) is an Indian open-water swimmer from Kalna, West Bengal. She is known for completing six of the seven channel crossings that constitute the Oceans Seven challenge. She became the first Indian woman to complete the North Channel and subsequently completed the Strait of Gibraltar in 2025, bringing her total to six Oceans Seven crossings.

Das began swimming at an early age and developed from competitive swimming into long-distance open-water swimming. She is from Baruipara in Kalna, Purba Bardhaman district, and was introduced to swimming by her father, Radheshyam Das. She later focused on long-distance swimming and trained in open-water environments in preparation for international channel crossings.

== Early life and swimming career ==
Das is from Baruipara in Kalna, in the Purba Bardhaman district of West Bengal. She was introduced to swimming by her father, Radheshyam Das, and began learning to swim at a young age. According to an interview published by the Centre for Stories, she started swimming at the age of six after her father took her to a local swimming pool and subsequently practised in the Ganges.

Das initially competed in pool swimming and represented West Bengal at state-level competitions, winning six gold medals at the State Championships. She also participated in the National Championships before moving towards long-distance open-water swimming.

She subsequently developed an interest in long-distance swimming and trained in the Ganges and other open-water environments. Contemporary reports describe her undertaking extensive endurance training, including long-duration swimming sessions, as preparation for international channel crossings.

Her early training was also affected by limited swimming infrastructure in her home region. In an interview with Anandabazar Patrika, Das said that she trained in the Ganges because of difficulties accessing a local swimming pool and had also practised in nearby rivers and ponds.

== Oceans Seven ==
The Oceans Seven is a challenge consisting of seven major open-water channel crossings: the North Channel, Cook Strait, Molokai Channel, English Channel, Catalina Channel, Tsugaru Strait and Strait of Gibraltar.

Das began her Oceans Seven campaign in 2017 with a crossing of the English Channel.

Oceans Seven crossings
| Channel | Date | Distance | Time | Notes |
|---|---|---|---|---|
| English Channel | 26–27 July 2017 | 33.5 km | 14 h 8 min | Crossed from England to France at age 19 |
| Catalina Channel | 8 June 2019 | 32.3 km | 12 h 46 min | Crossed from Santa Catalina Island to Southern California |
| Molokai Channel | 29 April 2022 | 45 km | 18 h 50 min | First Indian woman to complete the crossing |
| Cook Strait | 2 April 2024 | 23 km | 11 h 47 min 55 s | Crossed between New Zealand's North and South Islands |
| North Channel | 30 August 2024 | 35 km | 13 h 22 min 38 s | First Indian woman to complete the crossing |
| Strait of Gibraltar | 18 April 2025 | 14.4 km | 3 h 51 min | Crossed from Spain to Morocco |
| Tsugaru Strait | July 2026 | — | — | Attempt unsuccessful |

The distances and crossing times are reported by Openwaterpedia and contemporary media reports.

=== English Channel ===
On 26–27 July 2017, Das crossed the English Channel from England to France in 14 hours 8 minutes. She completed the 33.5-kilometre crossing at the age of 19.

The crossing marked the beginning of her Oceans Seven campaign and established her as a long-distance open-water swimmer on the international circuit.

=== Catalina Channel ===
On 8 June 2019, Das completed the 32.3-kilometre Catalina Channel crossing from Santa Catalina Island to Southern California in 12 hours 46 minutes.

=== Molokai Channel ===
On 29 April 2022, Das completed the approximately 45-kilometre Molokai Channel crossing between Molokai and Oahu in 18 hours 50 minutes. She was the first Indian woman to complete the crossing.

=== Cook Strait ===
On 2 April 2024, Das crossed Cook Strait in New Zealand between the North and South Islands. She completed the approximately 23-kilometre crossing in 11 hours 47 minutes 55 seconds.

=== North Channel ===
On 30 August 2024, Das crossed the North Channel between Northern Ireland and Scotland. The approximately 35-kilometre crossing took 13 hours 22 minutes 38 seconds.

The crossing made her the first Indian woman to complete the North Channel.

=== Strait of Gibraltar ===
On 18 April 2025, Das crossed the Strait of Gibraltar from Spain to Morocco, completing the sixth of the seven Oceans Seven channels. She completed the approximately 14.4-kilometre crossing in 3 hours 51 minutes in a tandem swim with American swimmer Ryan Utsumi.

The crossing left the Tsugaru Strait as the only remaining channel required for Das to complete the Oceans Seven challenge. Contemporary reports described her as the first Asian woman to have completed six of the seven channels.

=== Tsugaru Strait attempt ===
In 2026, Das travelled to Japan to attempt the Tsugaru Strait, the final remaining channel in her Oceans Seven campaign. The channel separates Honshu and Hokkaido and is known for strong currents, changing weather conditions and cold water.

During the July 2026 attempt, conditions deteriorated, with reports of waves exceeding two metres. Das swam approximately 15 kilometres before experiencing severe chest pain and being taken aboard the support boat. The swim was subsequently stopped, and she did not complete the Tsugaru Strait crossing.

As a result, Das remains a six-channel finisher in the Oceans Seven challenge.

== Awards and honours ==
Das has received several awards and honours for her achievements in swimming and open-water adventure.

- 2018 – Khelashree Award, Government of West Bengal, for achievements in swimming.
- 2025 – Mother Teresa International Award for her achievements in swimming.
- 2024 – Sera Bangali honour, presented by ABP Ananda in recognition of her achievements in sport.
- 2023 – Tenzing Norgay National Adventure Award, Water Adventure category, Government of India.
- 2025 – The Tenzing Norgay National Adventure Award for 2023 was presented to Das by President Droupadi Murmu at Rashtrapati Bhavan on 17 January 2025.

Other honours reported in connection with Das's swimming achievements include a Governor's Award of Excellence and the Calcutta Chamber of Commerce Sports Excellence Award.

== Personal life and training ==
Das has been coached and supported by her father, Radhashyam Das, who has been involved in her training and international swimming campaigns. She has also received technical guidance from swimming coach Tapan Kumar Panigrahi.

Her preparation for cold-water swims has included prolonged open-water training and cold-water acclimatisation. Reports have described her training in the Ganges and other open-water environments as part of her preparation for international channel swimming.

== See also ==
- Oceans Seven
- Marathon swimming
- Open water swimming
- English Channel
- North Channel
- Cook Strait
- Catalina Channel
- Molokai Channel
- Tsugaru Strait
- Strait of Gibraltar
