= Bogusław Ogrodnik =

Polish long-distance swimmer and mountaineer (born 1965)

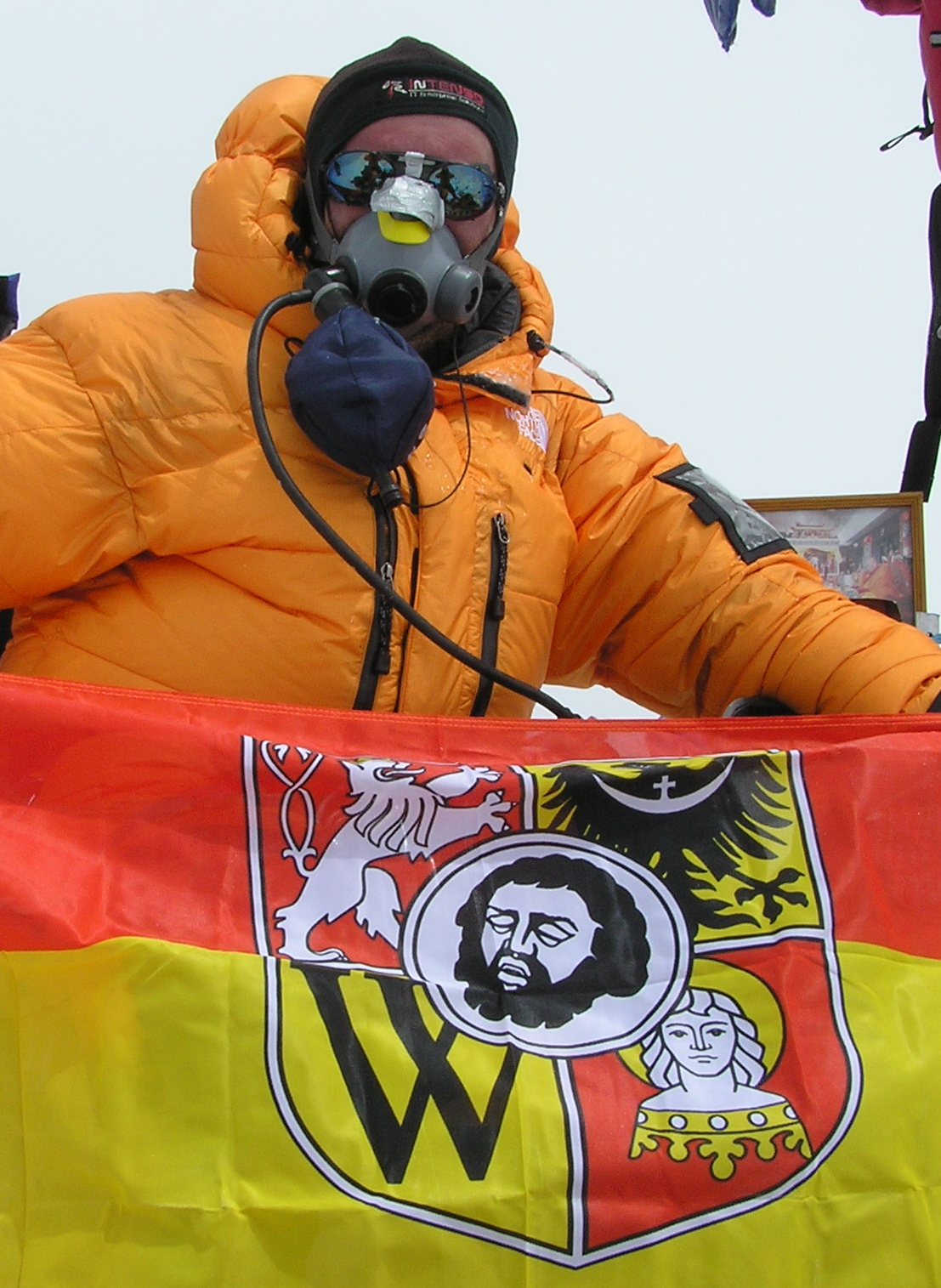

Personal information
- Full name: Bogusław Stanisław Ogrodnik
- Nationality: Polish
- Born: 20 February 1965 (age 61) Wrocław, Poland
- Occupations: Lawyer, entrepreneur

Sport
- Sport: Open water swimming, mountaineering, underwater diving

Bogusław Stanisław Ogrodnik (born 20 February 1965 in Wrocław) is a Polish long-distance swimmer, high-altitude mountaineer and diver, an entrepreneur and a lawyer by training. He has completed both the Seven Summits and the Oceans Seven (the so-called "Double Seven") and holds a world record for elevation difference.

== Biography ==
Ogrodnik graduated in coaching from the Faculty of Physical Education of the Academy of Physical Education in Wrocław (now Wrocław University of Health and Sport Sciences) and from the Faculty of Law of the University of Wrocław. He sits on the Advisory Board of the Faculty of Physical Education of AWF Wrocław. He is a member of, among others, the Polish Society of Hyperbaric Medicine and Technology, the Polish Mountaineering Association, the Channel Swimming & Piloting Federation, the International Ice Swimming Association, the International Association of Nitrox and Technical Divers, the Peak and Pond club and the 24-Hour Club.

He holds qualifications as an airborne-forces parachutist, a counter-terrorism company instructor, a diving instructor, a senior lifeguard and a motorboat skipper.

== Sporting achievements ==
=== Project 9000 ===
On 18 May 2006 Ogrodnik summited Mount Everest (8,848 m above sea level), and on 20 November 2008 he dived to a depth of 163 m in the Blue Hole in the Sinai. The total elevation difference between these two points was 9,011 m, a world record for vertical span.

He is a member of the Peak and Pond club, which brings together people who have both summited Mount Everest and swum the English Channel. According to the list kept by the World Open Water Swimming Association, he is one of nine members worldwide and the only Pole.

=== Double Seven ===
The Double Seven (Double Sevens) combines two challenges: the Seven Summits – the highest peaks of every continent – and the Oceans Seven – crossings of seven channels and straits. Ogrodnik pursued them from 2004 to 2026, from his ascent of Aconcagua in February 2004 to his crossing of the North Channel on 10 July 2026. He became the first Pole – and, according to open-water swimming news sites, the first person in the world – to complete both, counting Elbrus as the highest peak of Europe. He completed the Seven Summits in its classic form in 2008, and in all variants, including Mauna Kea and Mont Blanc, in 2022.

In June 2026 the American Rob Lea also announced the completion of both challenges, but he counted Mont Blanc as Europe's highest peak. For this reason ExplorersWeb questioned whether his Seven Summits were complete, titling its article "Seven Oceans, Six-and-a-Half Summits".

=== Seven Summits ===
Ogrodnik was the fourth Pole to complete the Seven Summits, which he did in 3 years and 11 months; for a long time he was the fastest Polish finisher. Summits in order of ascent:

- Aconcagua – 14 February 2004
- Mount Everest – 18 May 2006
- Elbrus – 10 July 2006
- Mount Kosciuszko – 19 November 2006
- Kilimanjaro – 18 February 2007
- Carstensz Pyramid – 31 March 2007
- Denali – 26 May 2007
- Mount Vinson – 18 January 2008

He completed both classic versions of the list (Bass and Messner). He later added the disputed summits and the tectonic variant: Mauna Kea (5 April 2015) and Mont Blanc (4 August 2022).

=== Oceans Seven ===
Ogrodnik was the first Pole to complete the Oceans Seven:

Body of water	Date	Distance	Time
Strait of Gibraltar	25 May 2013	14 km	5 h 28 min
English Channel	27 July 2014	34 km	20 h 33 min
Catalina Channel	6 September 2016	33 km	13 h 04 min
Tsugaru Strait	20 September 2018	20 km	12 h 30 min
Cook Strait	17 February 2025	26 km	12 h 18 min

He crossed the Kaiwi Channel at his second attempt; the first, in March 2015, was unsuccessful. He made several attempts at the North Channel before completing the crossing in 2026.

=== Other mountaineering achievements ===
- Cho Oyu (8,201 m) – 30 September 2004, without supplementary oxygen
- K2 – in 2010 he led a Polish expedition to the world's second-highest mountain; the expedition did not reach the summit
- Kilimanjaro – 13 February 2013, as leader of the Klub Biegacza Sobótka expedition, together with his children, 17-year-old Marta and 15-year-old Maciek, who became the youngest siblings to stand on the summit together
- Mauna Kea – 5 April 2015, with his daughter Marta and son Maciek; the highest mountain on Earth measured from its base on the ocean floor and the summit of the tectonic variant of the Seven Summits
- Mont Blanc – traverse, 4 August 2022
- Crown of the World – 50 of the roughly 200 national high points of the world
- Six Peaks Challenge – the highest peaks of England, Scotland, Wales, Ireland, Northern Ireland and the Isle of Man
- Diadem of the Polish Mountains (80 peaks), Crown of Polish Mountains (28 peaks), Crown of the Sudetes (22 peaks), Crown of the Lower Silesian Mountains (23 peaks; he is an ambassador of the project), Crown of Poland (16 peaks), Crown of the Balkans (8 highest peaks of the Balkan countries) and 40 of the 46 peaks of the Crown of Europe

== Long-distance swimming ==
=== Swimming crowns ===
- Triple Crown of Open Water Swimming – the first Pole to complete it: the English Channel (27 July 2014, 20 h 33 min), the Catalina Channel (6 September 2016, 13 h 04 min 12 s) and the circumnavigation of Manhattan (46 km, 23 July 2017, 8 h 13 min 49 s). Since he had already completed an Ice Mile (2016), the Manhattan swim also made him the first Pole on the list of Frosted Triple Crown holders.
- California Triple Crown – the first Pole to complete it: the Catalina Channel (2016), Lake Tahoe (34 km, 18 August 2018, 24 h 34 min 18 s; this swim made him the first Pole in the 24-Hour Club) and the Santa Barbara Channel (from Anacapa Island to the mainland, about 20 km, 11 October 2022, 9 h 32 min).
- Polish Triple Crown – the English Channel, the Catalina Channel and the Bay of Gdańsk. He proposed this variant together with Prof. Wojciech Wiesner (AWF Wrocław) at the 3rd scientific conference "State, Prospects and Development of Rescue, Physical Culture and Sport in the 21st Century" at the University of Economy in Bydgoszcz in 2015, and is its first finisher.
- Irish Triple Crown – the first Pole to complete it: the Fastnet Swim (20 km, from Baltimore to the Fastnet Lighthouse, 20 June 2025, 7 h 23 min 07 s), the Galway Bay Swim (10.5 km, from Aughinish to the Blackrock diving tower in Salthill, 15 August 2025, 5 h 19 min 05 s) and the North Channel (35 km, 10 July 2026).
- Original Triple Crown – the first Pole to complete it: the English Channel (2014), the North Channel (2026) and the Bristol Channel (26 km, from Glenthorne in England to Porthcawl in Wales, 8 August 2026, 14 h 11 min 04 s). According to the crossing's organiser, Monster Swims, he was the first Pole to swim the Bristol Channel.
- Maui Nui Swim – a three-day challenge of swimming three channels around Maui, Hawaii; as the first Pole he crossed the Pailolo Channel (13 km, 13 October 2025, 8 h 31 min), the Kalohi Channel (15 km, 14 October 2025, 6 h 52 min) and the ʻAuʻau Channel (14 km, 15 October 2025, 6 h 44 min).

=== Other crossings ===
- Bay of Gdańsk – on 23 August 2011 he swam the historic mid-20th-century route from Hel to Gdynia (about 20 km, 8 h 46 min) without a wetsuit, in water of 15.6–16.5 °C; it was the first crossing of this route since the 1970s. The swim was certified by the Maritime Office in Gdynia.
- Bay of Puck – since 2011 he has repeatedly swum the 11-kilometre route of the Sea Wolves Marathon (Maraton Wilków Morskich) from Puck to Chałupy and to Kuźnica, together with his son and daughter.
- Escape from Alcatraz – on 26 August 2012 he swam from Alcatraz Island to San Francisco together with his son and daughter, and received the Alcatraz 100 Club certificate.
- Strait of Gibraltar – on 25 May 2013 he swam from Tarifa (Spain) to Punta Almansa (Morocco), without a wetsuit, in 16 °C water, together with his 15-year-old son Maciek; they were the first father-and-son pair to swim from Europe to Africa. The crossing was certified by the Strait of Gibraltar Swimming Association (ACNEG).
- Strait of Messina – on 5 October 2015 he became the first Pole to swim it in both directions (7 km, 1 h 45 min 7 s), together with his son Maciek (1 h 51 min 2 s).
- Cozumel Channel – 29 November 2024 (14 h 11 min 52 s); he was the first swimmer from outside Mexico to cross this channel off Cozumel, and the seventh in history. Because of the strong current the actual distance covered was 44.45 km, against 18 km in a straight line.
- He has competed many times in the Balaton-átúszás (Lake Balaton crossing) on Lake Balaton.
- In 2014 he placed 3rd overall (2nd among men) in the nationwide 12-hour overnight swimming marathon Otyliada, covering 25.4 km in the pool in Strzelin.

=== Winter swimming ===
- On 20 February 2016, near Sobótka, he became the first Pole to complete an Ice Mile – 1.02 miles (about 1,640 m) in water of 3.9 °C, in 35 min 49 s.
- In 2016 he competed at the Winter Swimming World Championships in Tyumen, where he received a medal for 2nd place in his age group in the 2015/2016 International Winter Swimming Association World Cup.
- He competed at the Ice Swimming Aqua Sphere German Open in Burghausen (10 January 2016; 1 km in 3.9 °C water in 22 min 55 s) and in Veitsbronn (2018).
- Between 2014 and 2025 he won more than a dozen Polish winter swimming championship titles over various distances. He has stood on the podium at World Cup events many times, including in Burghausen, Jelgava, Minsk, Skellefteå, Gdynia and Gdańsk.

== Diving ==
Ogrodnik was one of the first Poles to dive the wrecks of the American nuclear test site at Bikini Atoll and the wrecks of Japanese warships in Chuuk Lagoon in Micronesia. He trained at the Natal Sharks Board in Durban. He took part, among other things, in Nuno Gomes's attempt at a technical diving world record (Sinai, 2004) and – as a member of Leszek Czarnecki's support team – in cave-diving expeditions in Mexico during which world records for cave penetration were set: the "Polish DPV Project – Mexico 2005" (14,000 m) and the 2009 expedition (over 17 km in the Dos Ojos system on the Yucatán, 9 October 2009).

== Other challenges ==
- Iron Iceman – a title for completing the Ironman in Gdynia (8 August 2021, 15 h 42 min) and an Ice Mile (20 February 2016).
- Half-Ironman triathlons, including Ironman 70.3 races in Muscat, Dubai, Hurghada, Augusta and Warsaw, Challenge Gdynia and Challenge Family The Championship in Šamorín.
- Crown of Polish Half Marathons (2022).
- Participation in the first Polish overland expedition along the Baikal–Amur Mainline in Siberia.
- Bungee jump from the Bloukrans Bridge (216 m) in South Africa – 16 November 2002.
- Ultra-distance and orienteering events, including Harpagan, Twardziel Świętokrzyski, the Jelenia Góra Valley Traverse (Przejście Kotliny Jeleniogórskiej) and Carrera X Montaña Sierra de Chiva.

== Coaching and community work ==
Ogrodnik founded the Polish Ogrodnik Team, a team of ice and long-distance swimmers whose members have included Piotr Biankowski, Hanna Bakuniak, Aleksandra Bednarek, Marek Rother, Maciej Ogrodnik and Grzegorz Monczak. The team produced the first two Poles entered in the International Ice Swimming Association's Ice Mile register: Bogusław Ogrodnik (2016) and Piotr Biankowski (2017).

- In 2017 he swam in a four-person Polish team at the 50th anniversary Traversée Hivernale de la Meuse in Huy, Belgium; the organiser, the Cool Huy club, noted that the four Poles won two races.
- At the 5th Open Polish Winter Swimmers' Championships (Gdańsk, 2 December 2017) the Polish Ogrodnik Team won three of the four relay events; Ogrodnik swam in all three winning relays.
- At the Ice Swimming Aqua Sphere German Open in Veitsbronn (January 2018), team member Hanna Bakuniak won all five events and set a world record for 1 km in ice water (13:05.7), while the team's relay finished 2nd in the 4 × 50 m relay.
- Together with Aleksandra Bednarek and Hanna Bakuniak he co-created the "Polish Crossing of the Century" project (California, 2018), marking the 100th anniversary of Poland's regained independence: Bakuniak and Bednarek became the first Polish women to swim the Catalina Channel, while Ogrodnik swam Lake Tahoe. Aleksandra Bednarek later became the first Polish woman to complete the Triple Crown of Open Water Swimming (2021).

He initiated the Runner's Trail Avenue (Aleja Śladu Biegacza) in Sobótka, co-founded the Ślęża Half Marathon and the Klub Biegacza Sobótka running club, of which he was the first president.

== Scientific work ==
His research interests include safety in long-distance and cold-water swimming. He has presented papers at, among others, the scientific conferences of the Polish Society of Hyperbaric Medicine and Technology (Sopot, 2013; Lidzbark Warmiński, 2014), the 20th Tatra Scientific Symposium "Education of Tomorrow" (Zakopane, 2014), the National Scientific Conference of the Volunteer Water Rescue Service (WOPR) (Szczyrk, 2015), the 3rd conference "State, Prospects and Development of Rescue, Physical Culture and Sport in the 21st Century" (Bydgoszcz, 2015), a scientific conference in Lviv (2016), the 1st Regional Scientific Conference of WOPR Greater Poland (Poznań, 2017) and, regularly since 2013, the AWF Wrocław conference "Physical Activity in the Mountain Areas of Poland and the World" in Szklarska Poręba. In 2018 he gave a talk at TEDxWSB titled "Cykliczna struktura celów szansą zwiększenia naszej aktywności" ("A cyclical structure of goals as an opportunity to increase our activity").

=== Selected publications ===
- Rejman M., Siermontowski P., Konarski M., Ogrodnik B., Próba wyznaczenia czynników optymalizacji techniki pływania pod wodą na podstawie analizy ruchów napędowych techniką klasyczną oraz kraulem i delfinem [An attempt to determine factors optimising underwater swimming technique based on an analysis of propulsive movements in breaststroke, crawl and dolphin] (abstract), Biuletyn Polskiego Towarzystwa Medycyny i Techniki Hiperbarycznej, 20, 2013, pp. 41–42.
- Rejman M., Siermontowski P., Ogrodnik B., The evaluation of efficiency in the various leg-kicking techniques in scuba diving, in: B. Mason (ed.), Book of proceedings of the XII International Symposium on Biomechanics and Medicine in Swimming, Australian Institute of Sport, 2014, pp. 210–218.
- Ogrodnik B., Wiesner W., Zagrożenia podczas pływania długodystansowego i ekstremalnego [Hazards in long-distance and extreme swimming], Polish Hyperbaric Research, 48 (3), 2014, pp. 43–52.
- Wiesner W., Ogrodnik B., Edukacyjne wartości rekordowych osiągnięć w pływaniu długodystansowym [The educational value of record achievements in long-distance swimming], in: K. Denek, A. Kamińska, P. Oleśniewicz (eds.), Edukacja Jutra. Aspekty edukacji szkolnej, Oficyna Wydawnicza "Humanitas", 2014, pp. 335–349.
- Wiesner W., Ogrodnik B., Role of models in swimming education, in: K. Denek, A. Kamińska, P. Oleśniewicz (eds.), Education of Tomorrow. Since education in family to system aspects of education, Oficyna Wydawnicza "Humanitas", 2014, pp. 227–241.
- Wiesner W., Pawelec I., Ogrodnik B., Subiektywna ocena ryzyka wśród wybranych grup płetwonurków [Subjective risk assessment among selected groups of scuba divers] (abstract), Biuletyn Polskiego Towarzystwa Medycyny i Techniki Hiperbarycznej, 21, 2014, p. 55.
- Wiesner W., Ogrodnik B., Pływanie w wodach otwartych – Polska Potrójna Korona [Open water swimming – the Polish Triple Crown], in: M. Napierała, A. Skaliy (eds.), Stan, perspektywy i rozwój ratownictwa, kultury fizycznej i sportu w XXI wieku, vol. II, Wyższa Szkoła Gospodarki w Bydgoszczy, 2015, pp. 199–217.
- Kowal-Orczykowska A., Ogrodnik B., Swimming in cold water – sport for everyone and activity conducive to favourable ageing, in: Problemy aktywizacji działalności rekreacyjno-zdrowotnej ludności, Lviv, 2016, pp. 196–200.
- Wiesner W., Ogrodnik B., Ostrowski A., Szymczak R., Zasady pływania w akwenach górskich na przykładzie projektu przeprawy pływackiej przez jezioro Titicaca [Principles of swimming in mountain waters, based on the project of a swimming crossing of Lake Titicaca], in: P. Zarzycki (ed.), Górska aktywność ruchowa człowieka – wybrane problemy badawcze, Studia i Monografie AWF we Wrocławiu, no. 145, Wydawnictwo AWF we Wrocławiu, 2023, pp. 162–178.

== Awards and honours ==
- 2008 – the Golden Fin (Złota Płetwa) award of Nurkowanie magazine for Project 9000 (presented in March 2009)
- 2009 – Award of the Mayor of Wrocław for services to the city
- 2009 – unveiling of a cast of his expedition boot print on the Conquerors' Square (Skwer Zdobywców) in Karpacz (13 September 2009, part of the "Conquerors' Trail" initiative of the Karpacz Town Office and the Szkoła Górska mountain school), alongside Bogdan Jankowski, Janusz Majer and Aleksander Lwow
- 2012 – joint first jury prize in the "Event" category at the "10 minut" film festival in Sopot for Tomasz Kuc's film Maraton Morski (Sea Marathon), documenting the swim across the Bay of Gdańsk
- 2021 – nomination for the World Open Water Swimming Man of the Year title (the only Pole among 15 nominees)

== Charity and educational work ==
Ogrodnik donates flags carried to summits and other expedition items to charity auctions. The highest amount – €50,000 – was raised by the flag from the summit of Mount Everest. In total he has raised over US$100,000 in this way, donated to hospitals and schools in Wrocław.

He gives educational talks and presentations, among others for students of the 13th High School in Wrocław, the Youth Educational Centre in Sobótka and the Salesian Sisters' John Paul II Private School in Wrocław.
