= Nathalie Pohl =

German swimmer

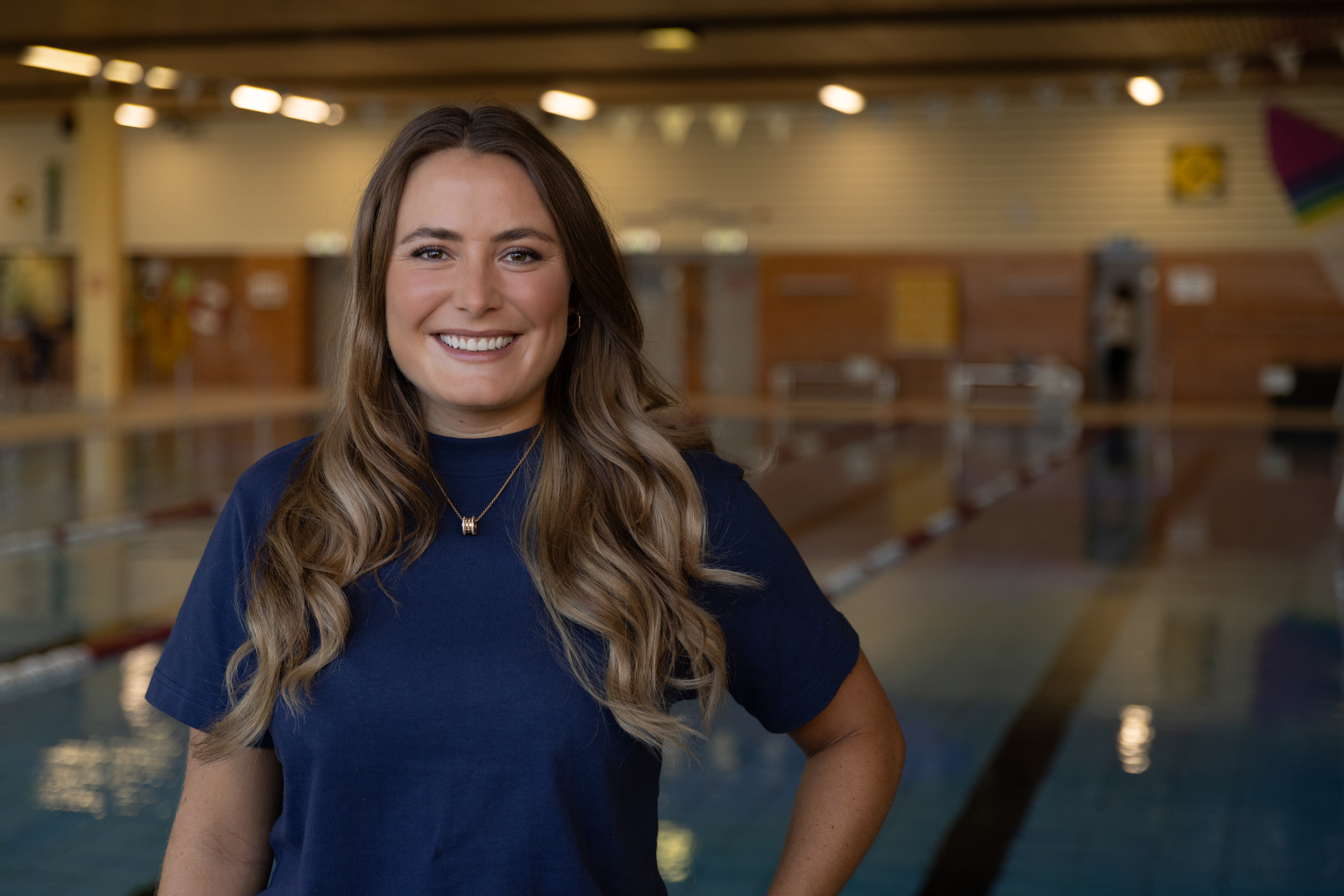

Personal information
- Born: October 13, 1994 (age 32) Marburg, Germany
- Website: nathaliepohl.de

Sport
- Sport: Swimming
- Strokes: Open water swimming

Nathalie Pohl (born 13 October 1994) is a German open water swimmer and extreme swimmer. She is also a two-time world record holder and holder of the Triple Crown of Open Water Swimming. Pohl completed all seven Oceans Seven swims in 2024, becoming the first German woman to achieve this milestone.

== Career ==
Pohl has been swimming since the age of five, initially for various Hessian clubs competitively. As a 19-year-old, she switched to open water swimming in 2014. In her first year, she took part in the Bodenseequerung (Lake Constance Crossing), the 27th Lake Zurich Swim in Switzerland as well as the Clean Half Marathon Swim and New World Harbour Race in Hong Kong.

In 2015, she launched her first attempt to cross the English Channel and thus the first leg of the Oceans Seven, but failed to do so. A year later, she set her first world record, breaking the previous women's record for the 14 km Strait of Gibraltar, which had been set in 2010. In October of the same year, she crossed the English Channel on her second attempt. Thus, in 2016, she had successfully completed two of the seven Oceans Seven legs. In 2017, Pohl crossed the Catalina Channel on her first attempt. A year later, she had to prematurely postpone her crossing of the Tsugaru Strait in Japan due to a broken rib.

In 2018, Pohl became the first German swimmer to achieve the Triple Crown of Open Water Swimming. She earned this title by crossing the English Channel and Catalina Canal in previous years, as well as completing the 20 Bridges Swim around Manhattan in June of that year.

In 2019, she completed Tsugaru Strait, her fourth leg of the Oceans Seven, on her second attempt. That same year, the first attempt to cross Cook Strait failed. In February 2020, she failed in her second attempt. However, in the same year, she achieved her second world record by crossing the Jersey Channel almost an hour faster than the previous record holder and over a quarter of an hour faster than any previous male swimmer. In August 2022, she crossed the Kaiwi Channel from Molokai to Oahu, her fifth leg of the Oceans Seven. In early 2023, she crossed Cook Strait on her third attempt, her sixth leg of the Oceans Seven.

In addition, she competed in international competitions, including in Israel, Australia, Spain and the United Arab Emirates. She is coached by Joshua Neuloh and Adam Walker.

== Achievements ==
=== Records ===
- 23 April 2016: World record for crossing the Strait of Gibraltar (14 km) in 2:53 hours,
- 7 September 2020: World record for crossing the Jersey Channel (22.5 km) in 5:29 hours,
- 1 July 2016: record for crossing Lake Constance between Friedrichshafen and Romanshorn (35 km) in 9:19 hours.

=== Swims of the Oceans Seven ===
Track	Start/End	Length	Duration	Date	Remarks
Strait of Gibraltar	Morocco and Spain	14 km	02:53	2016-04-23	fastest female swimmer (world record)
English Channel	England and France	34 km	11:10	2016-09-21	fastest German female swimmer
Catalina Channel	Santa Catalina Island and Los Angeles	34 km	09:09	2017-06-19	first German female swimmer, fastest female European
Tsugaru Strait	Island Honshu and Hokkaido, Japan	20 km	10:09	2019-08-05	first German female swimmer, fastest female European
Kaiwi Channel	Islands Molokaʻi and Oʻahu, Hawaii	44 km	15:05	2022-08-17	first German female swimmer
Cook Strait	South and North Island of New Zealand	26 km	06:33	2023-03-01	first German female swimmer, fastest female European
North Channel	Northern Ireland and Scotland	41	11:05	2024-09-15	first German female swimmer

=== International competition placings ===
- 10 August 2014: 27th Lake Zurich Swim, Switzerland (26 km): 2nd place women in 7:43 hours,
- 20 June 2014: Breitenquerungen, Lake Constance (12 km): 1st place women in 2:50 hours,
- 11 October 2014: Clean Half Marathon Swim, Hong Kong (15 km): 10th place women in 4:49 hours,
- 12 October 2014: New World Harbour Race, Hong Kong (1.5 km): 3rd place women,
- 23 July 2017: Bosphorus Cross Continental Swim, Turkey (6.5 km): 2nd place women, 6th overall,
- 25 February 2018: Rottnest Channel Swim, Australia (20 km): fastest European and in the women's top 20,
- 30 June 2018: 20 Bridges Swim, New York (46 km): 3rd fastest European and fastest German in 8:12 hours,
- 28 January 2019: Red Sea Swim Cup, Israel (7.5 km): 1st place women in 1:46 hours,
- 7 June 2021: Menorca Channel Crossing, Spain (40 km): 1st place women in 9:50 hours,
- 12 March 2022: Oceanman, United Arab Emirates (10 km): 1st place among women in the age group 20–29 years in 2:38 hours.

== Further engagement ==
Pohl has been an investor in Restube since 2018. The company sells a sort of airbag for swimmers in the water. She is also the patron of the Water Experience Academy initiated by the company. The academy raises children's awareness of swimming in open water so that they can move safely there. Pohl is also a founding member of the non-profit organisation DVAG hilft e. V. – Menschen brauchen Menschen. Among other things, the association offers free beginners' swimming courses for children aged five to eleven in cooperation with the Marburger Tafel and the DLRG Marburg.

== Private life ==
Pohl is the granddaughter of Reinfried Pohl (deceased), founder of Deutsche Vermögensberatung AG, and daughter of Andreas Pohl, Chairman of the board of Deutsche Vermögensberatung AG.
