= Prabhat Koli =

Indian Swimmer

Prabhat Raju Koli
Personal information
- Native name: प्रभात राजू कोली
- Born: 27 July 1999; Nerul, Mumbai, Maharashtra, India

Sport
- Country: India
- Sport: Open water swimming

Prabhat Raju Koli (born 27 July 1999) is an Indian open water swimmer based in Mumbai. In 2018, Koli was awarded with the Tenzing Norgay National Adventure Award, which was presented by Ramnath Kovind, the President of India. He was also awarded with Shiv Chhatrapati Award by the Maharashtra government.

== Swimming ==
In 2016, Koli participated in the 81 kilometres (50 mi) India National Open Water Swimming Competition in West Bengal. He has swum 66 kilometres (41 mi) around the Isle of Jersey; 34 kilometres (21 mi) across the English Channel; 8 kilometres (5.0 mi) in the Cape Town, South Africa, Langban Swim; 7.4 kilometres (4.6 mi) from Robben Islandin to Blouberg, South Africa; 8 kilometres (5.0 mi) from Landudno to Campus Bay, South Africa; 32.3 kilometres (20.1 mi) across the Catalina Channel in California; 42 kilometres (26 mi) across the Molokai Channel in Hawaii. He participated in the 45.9 kilometres (28.5 mi), 20 Bridges Swim in New York; swam 15.2 kilometres (9.4 mi) across the Bodenseequerung, from Lindau, Germany, to Rorschach, Switzerland; 19.5 kilometres (12.1 mi) across the Tsugaru Strait in Japan; 35 kilometres (22 mi) across the North Channel; and 14.4 kilometres (8.9 mi) across the Strait of Gibraltar from Spain to Morocco.

== Honours ==
Koli has won awards for being:

- The youngest swimmer of the Triple Crown of Open Water.
- The first Asian swimmer to swim from Germany to Switzerland.
- The youngest swimmer to swim from Llandudno to Camps Bay in South Africa.
- First Asian swimmer to swim from Jersey to France.
- The first swimmer to swim along the Cape Town coast in South Africa.
- The first Asian swimmer to swim in the mainland in Anacapa.

== See also ==
- List of Koli people
- List of Koli states and clans
