= Deniz Kayadelen =

Turkish-German open-water swimmer and speaker

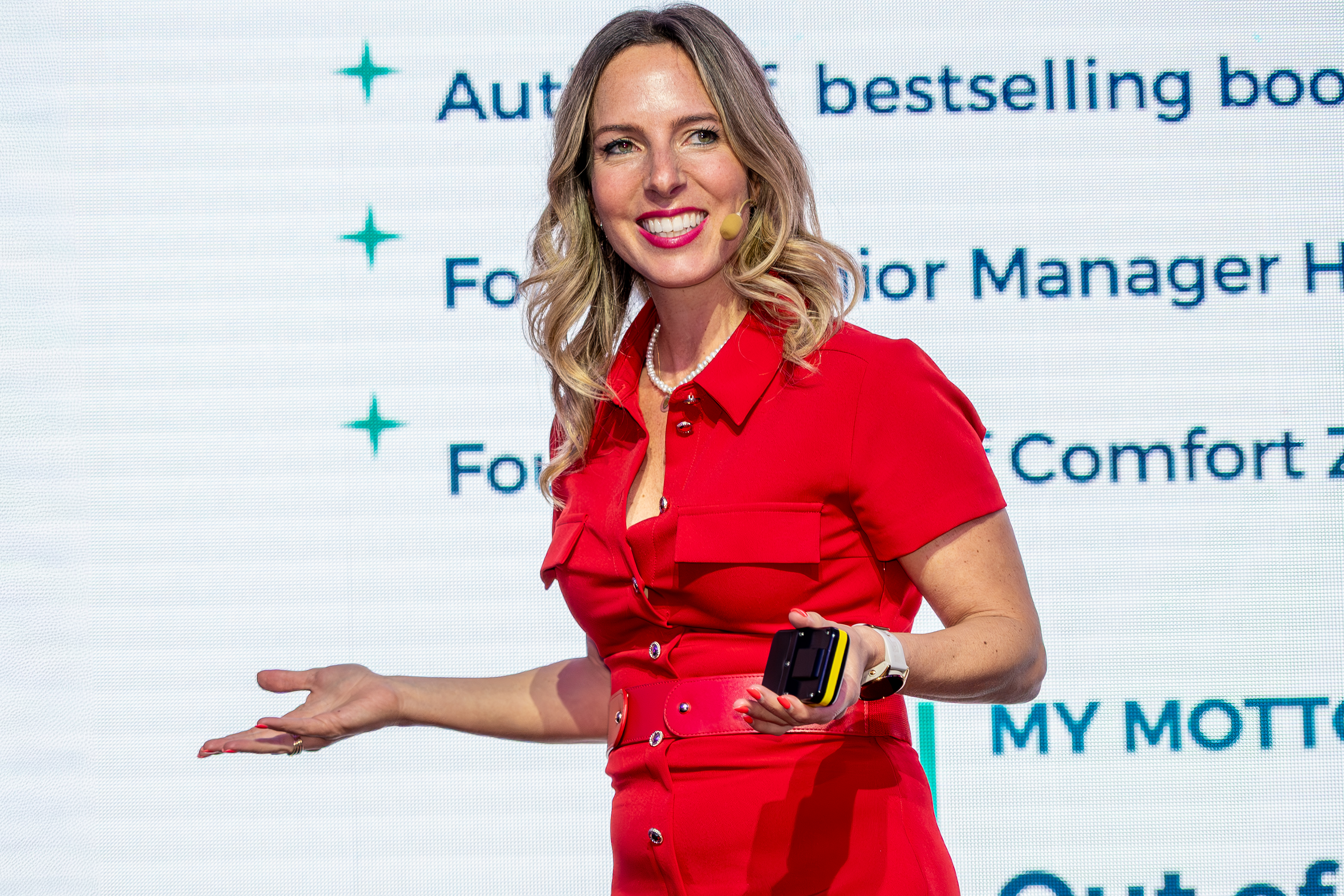
Deniz Kayadelen, extreme swimmer and inspirational speaker. Photo taken in 2026.

Deniz Kayadelen (born 20 June 1987) is a Turkish-German open-water swimmer, extreme swimmer, motivational speaker, and author. She is a holder of the Triple Crown of Open Water Swimming and shares the Guinness World Record for the highest swim on Earth with five other members of the Madswimmer Team. She is also an age category ice swimming world champion and has crossed the English Channel. She is also a business psychologist and consultant.

== Early life and education ==
Kayadelen was born in Frankfurt, Germany, and moved to Turkey at age 11 following her parents' divorce. She completed her high school education at European College. She pursued her university studies at Istanbul University in Turkey and Bochum Ruhr University in Germany, earning a double diploma in psychology. She specialized in organizational psychology obtaining a master's degree in business and organizational psychology from Bochum Ruhr University.

== Swimming career ==
Kayadelen's swimming journey began in her youth, starting at Yeşilyurt Sports Club in Turkey before continuing at Bakırköy Ataspor Club. She began open water swimming in 2008, participating in the Istanbul Bosphorus Cross-Continental race, earning 4th place initially and subsequently 1st place in the following years. She achieved first place in Arena Aquamasters competitions, setting two Turkish masters national records in her age category in 2019 and 2022.

Kayadelen began marathon swimming in 2019, completing two international relay swims. She first crossed the North Channel with the "Mad Turks" relay team, the first Turkish relay team to complete the crossing. Later that year, the same team, renamed "Out of Comfort Zone", completed a relay crossing of the English Channel, swimming 33.5 km from England to France in 11 hours and 40 minutes.

In March 2020, Kayadelen completed a solo crossing from Robben Island to Blouberg in South Africa, becoming the first Turkish woman to achieve the feat. She completed the crossing in 2 hours and 28 minutes alongside Ryan Stamrood, who holds the record for the most Robben Island crossings. Later that year, she participated in the Peace Route Swim for World Peace Day, where a nine-person relay team swam 91.27 km from Northern Cyprus to Mersin, Turkey. The swim was nominated for the 2020 WOWSA Award for World Open Water Swimming Performance of the Year.

In June 2021, Kayadelen participated in a six-day world-record relay attempt covering approximately 320 km from Sochi, Russia, to Giresun, Turkey.

In 2022 and 2023, Kayadelen became an age category ice swimming world champion at the 4th and 5th IISA World Championships. At the 2022 championships in Głogów, Poland, she won gold in the 500 m freestyle, 250 m freestyle and 50 m butterfly in her age category in 3.2 °C water. At the 2023 championships in Samoëns, France, she won gold in the 50 m and 100 m butterfly in her age category in 4.2 °C water.

In July 2023, Kayadelen completed a solo crossing of the English Channel, one of the Oceans Seven swims and part of the Triple Crown of Open Water Swimming, on her first attempt. Although the shortest distance between England and France is approximately 32 km, strong tidal currents extended her swim to 57 km, which she completed in 15 hours and 8 minutes in 16 °C water.

In 2024, Kayadelen completed the remaining two swims required to earn the Triple Crown of Open Water Swimming. She crossed the Catalina Channel in July in 14 hours and 49 minutes, before completing the 20 Bridges Manhattan Island Swim the following month in 7 hours, 58 minutes and 4 seconds, becoming the fastest Turkish woman to complete the Manhattan Island swim.

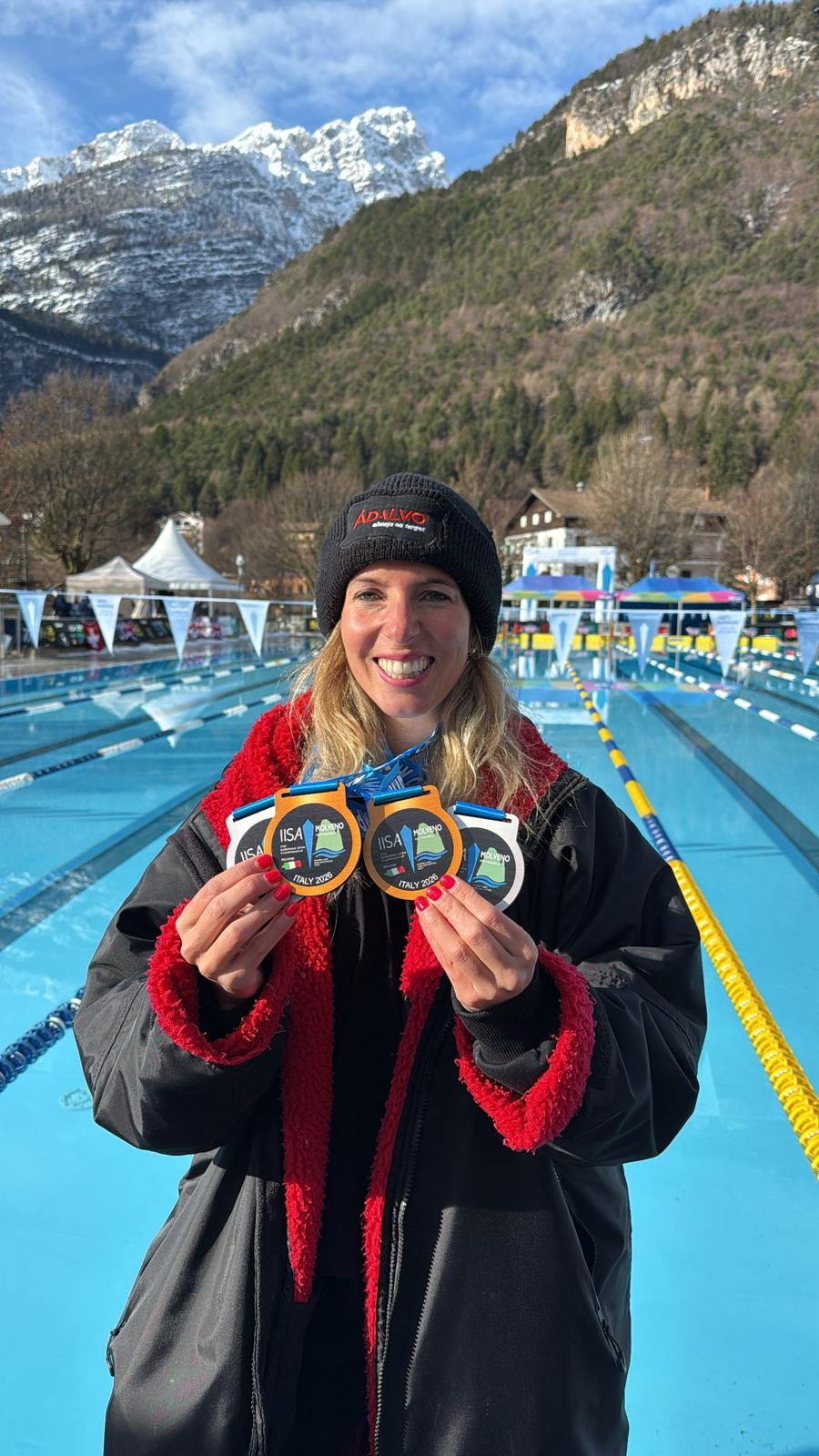
Deniz Kayadelen won four medals in the age group category (two gold and two silver) at the 2026 IISA European Ice Swimming Championships in Molveno, Italy, five months after giving birth to her daughter.

In February 2026, Kayadelen competed at the IISA European Ice Swimming Championships in Molveno, Italy, in 1 °C water. Five months after giving birth to her daughter, she won four medals across four races: gold in the 100 m butterfly and 250 m freestyle, and silver in the 100 m freestyle and 50 m butterfly in her age category.

Also in 2026, Kayadelen completed a solo crossing of the Strait of Gibraltar, swimming 15.8 km from Europe to Africa in 4 hours and 41 minutes in 16 °C water without a wetsuit, dedicating the swim to raising awareness for world peace. With this crossing, she completed her fourth of the seven swims in the Oceans Seven challenge.

As of July 2026, Kayadelen is preparing for an expedition to Svalbard, Norway, where she plans to attempt an ice swim near the North Pole, the first swim of its kind in the region.

== World record ==
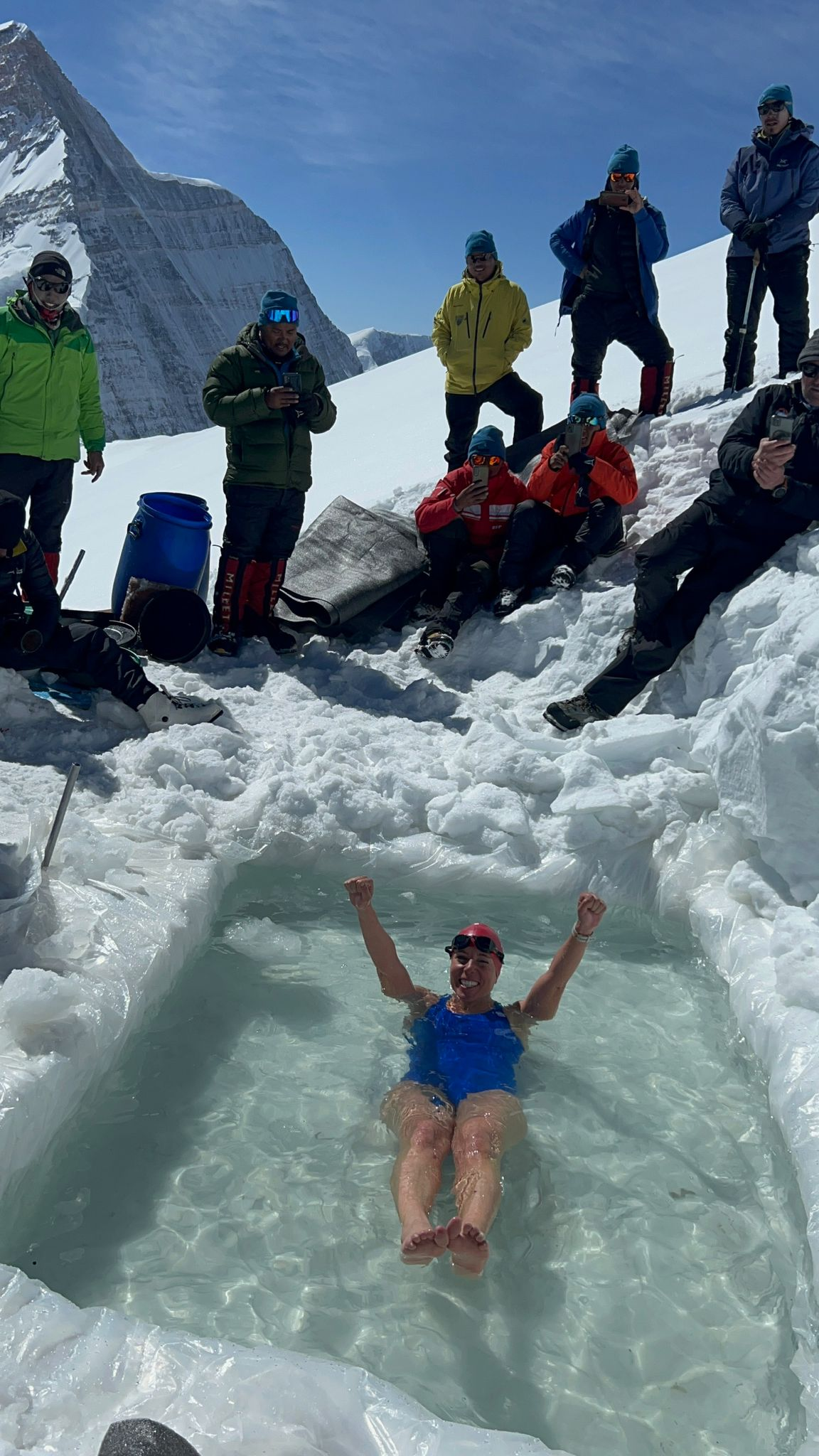
Deniz Kayadelen, as part of Madswimmer team, broke the Guinness World Record for the highest Swim on Earth in Mount Putha Hiunchuli

On 10 May 2024, Deniz Kayadelen, as part of the Madswimmer team, set a world record for the highest swim on Earth at 6,405 meters on Putha Hiunchuli in the Himalayas. They did a 15-day ascent covering 138 kilometers on foot to reach the swimming point.

The Madswimmer mission aimed to raise awareness about climate change and raise funds for two African charities. Finding no water at a height of 6,405 meters, the team carved a swimming hole in the ice and filled it with melted ice. They swam in 3.7 °C water with an outside temperature of -6 °C, taking three-minute turns.

The expedition team included:

- Jean Craven (Swimmer and sponsor, creator of Madswimmer ONG).
- Vanes-Mari du Toit (Swimmer and sports personality).
- Neo Mokuene (Swimmer and award-winning SA filmmaker).
- Sean Disney (Tour Guide).
- Chiara Baars (ER Doctor).

Almost all participants lacked mountaineering experience.

== International competition placings ==
- 2026: IISA European Ice Swimming Championships, Molveno, Italy — Gold in 100m Butterfly (age category), Gold in 250m Freestyle (age category), Silver in 100m Freestyle (age category), Silver in 50m Butterfly (age category), water temp. 1°C
- 2024: Winter Swimming World Championship, 3rd place Ice Swimming in 200m and 450m freestyle age category 35-39, water temp. 0.2 degrees, Tallinn, Estonia
- 2023: IISA 5th World Championships, 1st place in Ice Swimming (50m and 100m Butterfly) age category 35-39, Samoens, France
- 2022: IISA 4th World Championships, 1st place in Ice Swimming in 500m - 250m Freestyle and 50m Butterfly age category 35-39, water temp. 3.2 degrees, Poland Glogow
- 2022: Aquamasters Arena Turkish Championship: - Record age category - 1500 Freestyle
- 2019: Aquamasters Arena Turkish Championship: 50m, 200m Butterfly, woman 1st place (200m age category record) - Turkish national record
- 2019: 10k Oceanman turkey – 3rd place – 2:55:55.17
- 2018: 9th International Arena Aquamasters Swimming Championship – 3 km first place 18
- 2016 – 5 km German championship open water – top 15
- 2015: Bosphorus Cross-Continental Swimming Race, 6.5 km, Age Category 25-29 Woman 1st
- 2015: International Hessian Open Water Swimming Championships - 5k open water 3rd place
- 2014: 42.4 kilometers swim in 24 hours in Stuttgart, Germany, woman 1st Place
- 2013: 39 kilometers swim in 24 hours in Stuttgart, Germany, 2nd place

== Recognition ==
In 2025, Deniz Kayadelen was listed by MSN among the Top 10 Self-Made Women to Watch. She also received the Power Feminine Speaker Award at the Women's Health and Mindfulness Leadership Congress in Paris.

Additional coverage of her career and impact appeared in Winspire Live.

== Other work ==
=== Consultancy ===
In addition to her swimming career, Kayadelen has established herself as a consultant with over 15 years of experience specializing in talent management, change management and work motivation. Kayadelen has also founded her own company, "Out of Comfort Zone," focusing on fear management, resilience, and motivation. She works with cold water immersion and coaching with individuals and teams in companies.

=== Media projects ===
In January 2024, the German television channel SAT3 released the Documentary "Motivation Superpower—Strong Will to Achieve Your Goal" (Superkraft Motivation—Willensstarkzum Ziel) based on Deniz Kayadelen's life. The documentary explores the science behind motivational forces, focusing on psychological and neuroscience aspects and presenting diverse case studies.

Kayadelen also participated in an ARD German TV channel documentary called "My body. My feel-good temperature—Cold" (Mein Körper. Meine Wohlfühltemperatur —Kälte), released in February of the same year. This documentary explores the impact of cold water on the body and the ways in which cold can be beneficial. It shows different case studies of people who have developed resistance to the cold, Kayadelen being one of them.

=== Books ===
She is the author of the upcoming book From Fear to Peak Flow: Break Through Limits with a Groundbreaking Fusion of Neuroscience, Psychology, Business, Extreme Sports, and Spiritual Wisdom, which presents the "Peak Flow Method", a framework integrating extreme athletic performance, corporate leadership, and psychology.

She is also the author of Out of Comfort Zone: Cutting Edge Business Lessons Based on Sports Psychology from the Experience of an Extreme Swimmer, first published in December 2020. It has been translated into German and Turkish. In this book, Kayadelen documents her career as an extreme swimmer and provides observations about overcoming challenges and achieving success. Swimming is used both as a metaphor and a bridge to corporate life.

She wrote her first book in German in 2011, "German Expats in Turkey: Successful Management in an International Context."
