= Bárbara Hernández =

Chilean open water swimmer (born 1985)

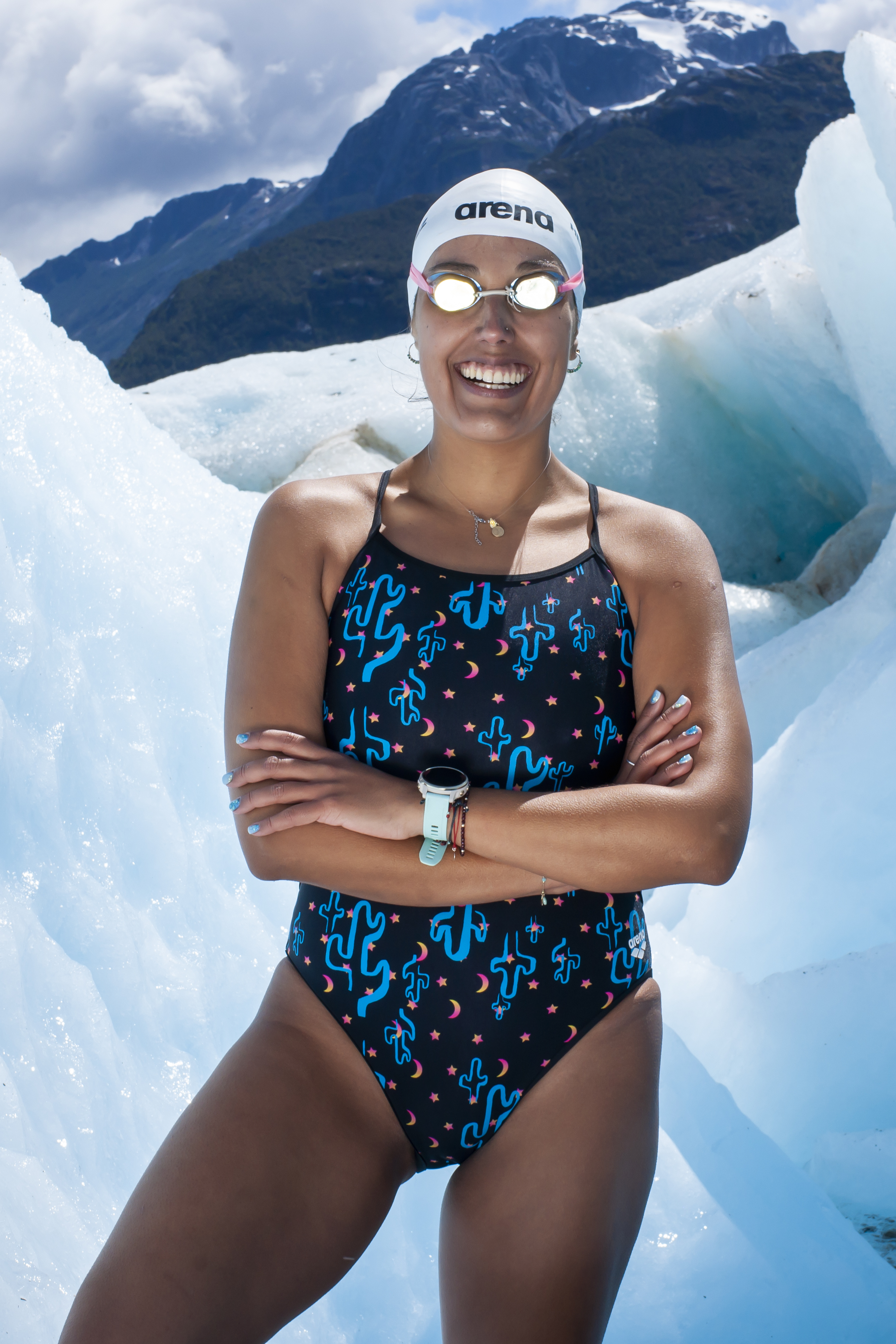

Personal information
- Nickname: "Ice Mermaid" (Sirena del Hielo)
- Born: 31 December 1985 (age 40) Santiago, Chile

Sport
- Sport: Swimming
Medal record
Open water swimming
International Winter Swimming Association
Gold medal – first place	Tyumen 2016, Bled 2020 and Tallinn 2024
International Ice Swimming Association
Gold medal – first place	Murmansk 2018, Samoëns 2023, and Molveno 2025

Bárbara Milenka Hernández Huerta (born 31 December 1985) is a Chilean open water swimmer, known as the "Ice Mermaid" (Sirena del Hielo). She has been a world champion in ice water swimming and in open water

In 2022, 2023 and 2025, she achieved four Guinness World Records. The following year, she became the first South American to complete the Oceans Seven challenge.

== Biography ==
Born in Santiago, Hernández graduated as a psychologist from the University of Chile in 2012, and in 2017, she earned a master's degree in psychology from the same institution.

At the age of 17, she began her journey in open water swimming, inspired by Chilean swimmer Víctor Contreras, Americans swimmers Lynne Cox and Jaimie Monahan, and Mexican swimmer Nora Toledano.

In 2014, she received an invitation to participate in that year's Winter Swimming Festival, where she swam in −5 °C waters at the Perito Moreno Glacier in Argentina without a wetsuit or any insulating grease to protect against the cold.

Hernández topped the global Ice Swimming ranking according to the International Winter Swimming Association (IWSA) during the 2017-2018 and 2018-2019 seasons. She was also awarded age category world championship titles by IWSA in Tyumen 2016, Bled 2020 and Tallinn 2024. In addition, she has been recognized by the International Ice Swimming Association (IISA), earning age category championship titles in Murmansk 2018, Samoëns 2023, and Molveno 2025.

In 2024, Hernández crossed the Tsugaru Strait in Japan, becoming the first South American to complete the Oceans Seven challenge.
