= North Channel Bridge (disambiguation) =

The North Channel Bridge crosses the north channel of the Mississippi River between Latsch Island, Winona, Minnesota and Buffalo County, Wisconsin.

North Channel Bridge may also refer to:

- Joseph P. Addabbo Memorial Bridge, Queens, New York
- A hypothetical Irish Sea fixed crossing between Ireland and Scotland
- Part of Seaway International Bridge, Cornwall, Ontario, Canada; along with the South Channel Bridge to Massena, New York

== See also ==
- North Channel (disambiguation)
