= Ogrodnik =

Ogrodnik is a surname. Notable people with the surname include:

- Bogusław Ogrodnik (born 1965), Polish mountaineer, swimmer, diver, and entrepreneur
- Dawid Ogrodnik (born 1986), Polish actor
- Magdalena Ogrodnik (born 1989), Polish sportsperson and athletics competitor
