= Marathon swimming =

Class of swimming

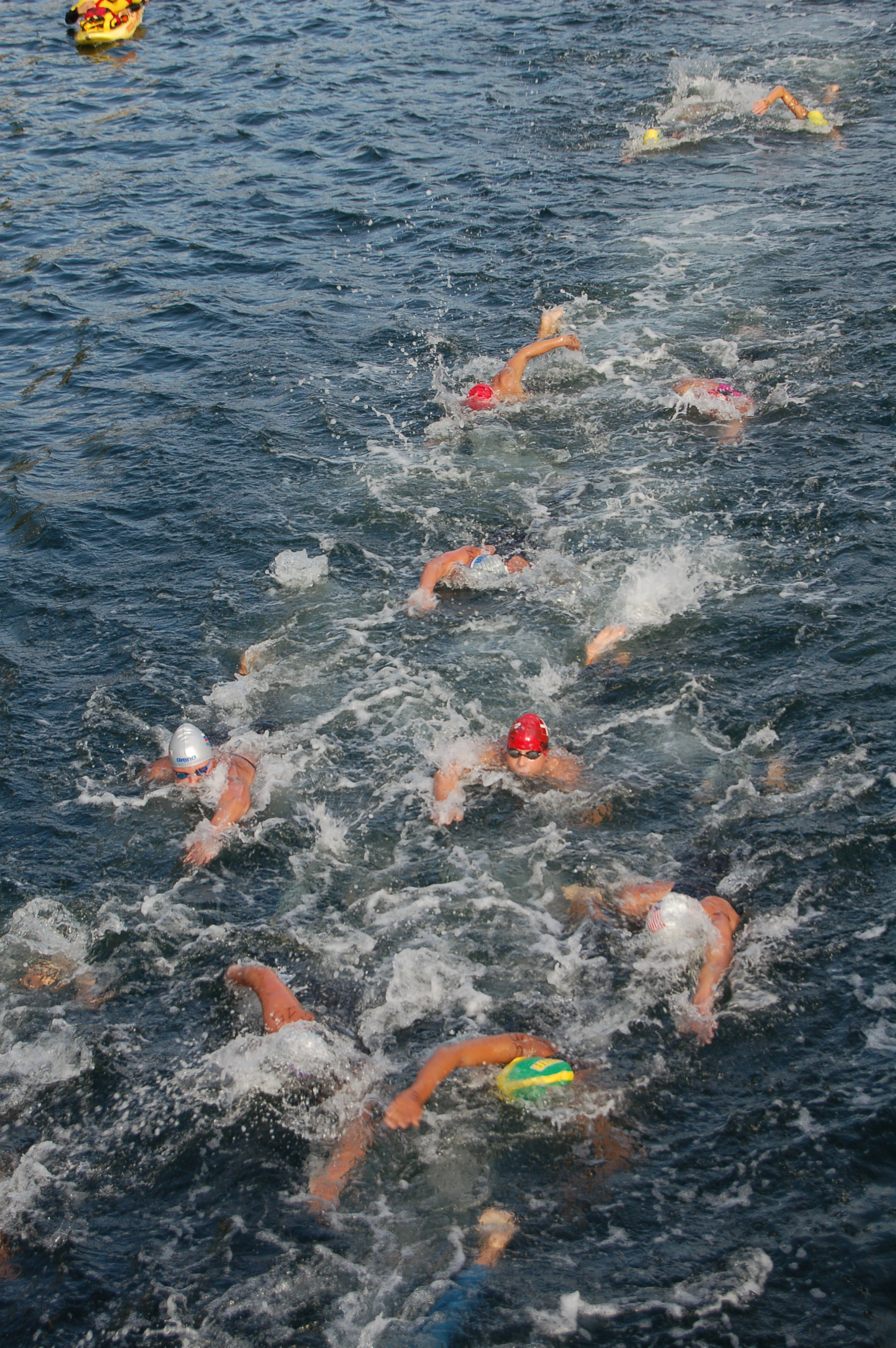
FINA 10K World Cup 2009, Copenhagen

Marathon swimming is a class of open water swimming defined by long distances, with 10 kilometers (6.21 miles) being the unofficially held minimum distance. Routes are typically geographically based or buoy based. Geographical routes include crossings of channels and lakes, circumnavigations of islands, and stretches of coast lines or rivers. Buoy-routes are mainly found in competition events.

Perhaps the most famous route in marathon swimming crosses the English Channel, first accomplished in 1875 by Captain Matthew Webb in 21h:45m. The first woman to complete the crossing was Gertrude Ederle 14h:39m in 1926 as a 19 year old, thereby setting a new fastest known time by 1h:54m by employing the crawl stroke technique.

Finish times for routes are highly dependent on environmental conditions and cultural context. Environmental factors include water temperature, tides, surface currents, and wind-chop. Cultural factors include swim direction, allowed equipment and swimmer assistance. These may be established by route convention (e.g. English Channel), by event organizers, or by personal goals, with Marathon Swimmers Federation rules often used as a foundation. Since environmental and cultural factors can vary dramatically, comparisons of finish times are often debatable.

The Triple Crown of Open Water Swimming comprises three marathon swims:

- 34 kilometers (21 mi) across the English Channel
- 32.3 kilometers (20.1 mi) between Santa Catalina Island and the mainland in Southern California, US
- 45.9 kilometers (28.5 mi) around Manhattan Island in New York City, US.

The first known completion of the triple was in 1987 by Alison Streeter MBE of English Channel fame.

The Ocean's seven comprises seven channel swims:

1. North Channel between Ireland and Scotland
2. Cook Strait between the North and South Islands of New Zealand
3. Molokai Channel between the islands of Oahu and Molokai in Hawaii
4. English Channel between England and France
5. Catalina Channel between Santa Catalina Island and the mainland, in Southern California
6. Tsugaru Strait between the islands of Honshu and Hokkaido in Japan
7. Strait of Gibraltar between Europe and Africa.

The first known completion of the septet was in 2012 by Steve Redmond of Ireland.

In the Olympic Games, the marathon swimming event distance is 10 kilometers (6.21 miles).

== Solo swims ==
- English Channel
- Catalina Channel (Santa Catalina – mainland)
- North Channel (Great Britain and Ireland) (formerly known as the Irish Channel)
- Tsugaru Strait
- Strait of Gibraltar
- Strait of Bonifacio
- Rottnest Channel Swim (Australia)
- Cook Strait
- Swim Miami
- Beltquerung
- Otranto Strait
- Backstairs Passage
- Lake Tahoe

== Group swims ==
- Rottnest Channel Swim (Australia)
- FINA World Aquatics Championships
- FINA World Open Water Swimming Championships

== See also ==
- English Channel swimmers
- Ocean's seven
- King of the Channel
- Queen of the Channel
