= North Canal =

North Canal or Northern Canal may refer to several places:

== China ==
- The Northern Canal of the Grand Canal (China), a system of interconnected canals in China

== France ==
- Canal du Nord (built 1965), literally Canal of the North, a canal in France
- Seine–Nord Europe Canal, literally Seine-North Europe Canal, a planned canal in France

== The Netherlands ==
- Noordhollandsch Kanaal (built 1824), literally Great North Holland Canal, a canal in the Netherlands
- North Sea Canal (built 1876), a canal in the Netherlands

== Russia ==
- Northern Catherine Canal (built 1822), also known as the Northern Ekaterininsky Canal or Catherine's Canal, an abandoned canal in the Komi Republic and Perm Krai in Russia
- Northern Dvina Canal (built 1828), a canal in Vologda Oblast in Russia

== Ukraine ==
- North Crimean Canal, an irrigation canal in Kherson Oblast and Crimea

== United States ==
- The North Canal (built 1845) and North Canal Historic District of Lawrence, Massachusetts, USA
- North Canal Township Park, a park across the Keweenaw Waterway from McLain State Park near Houghton, Michigan, USA
- Several canals in Oregon: List of canals in Oregon

== See also ==
- North Channel (disambiguation)
