= Molokai Hoe =

Annual outrigger canoe race

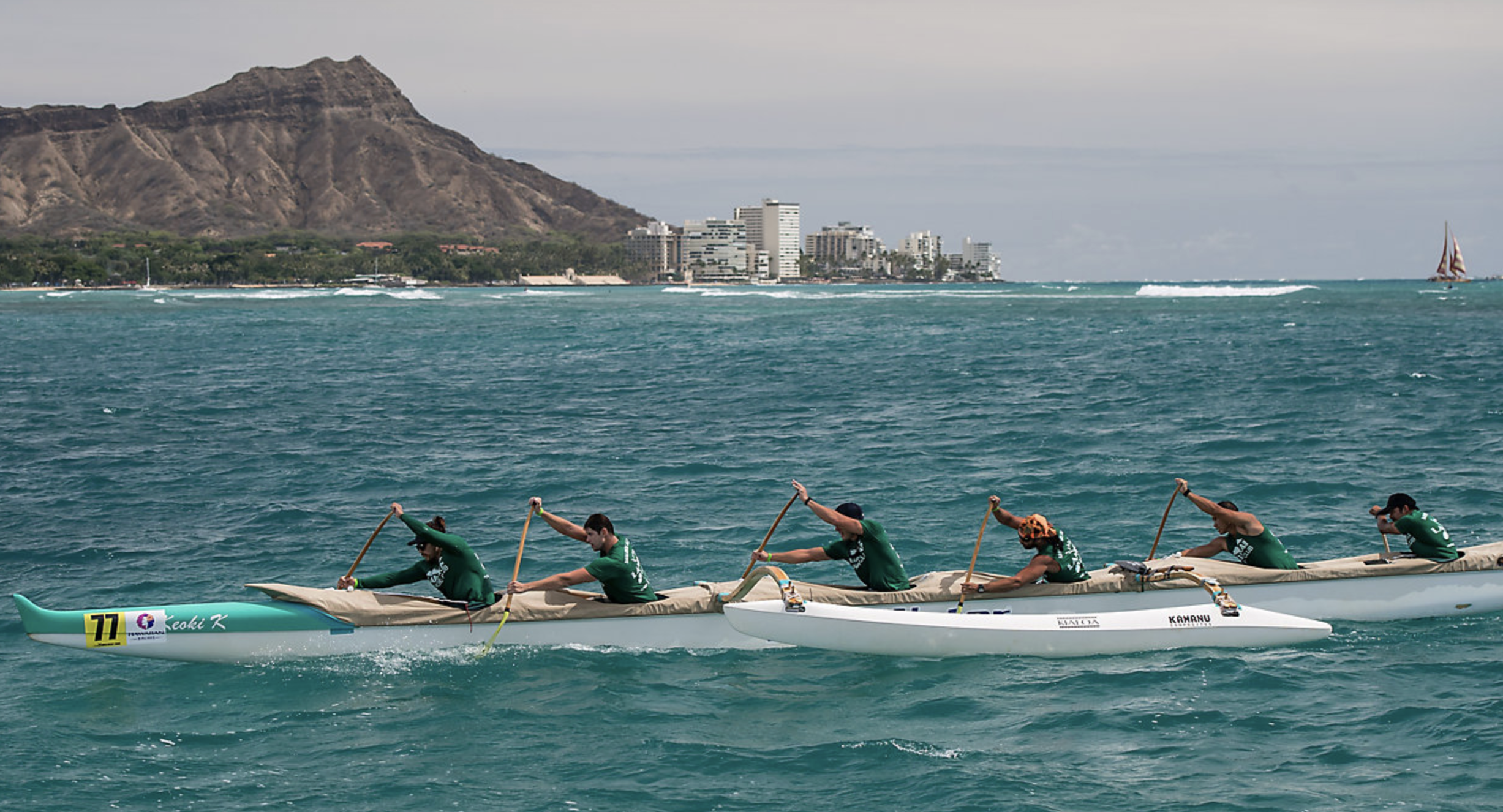
Men competing in the Molokai-hoe

The Moloka'i Hoe is an annual outrigger canoe race between the islands of Molokaʻi and Oʻahu, Hawaii. The race is one of Hawaii's largest annual sporting events, drawing participants from Hawaii and the U.S. mainland as well as internationally. Participating countries include Australia, New Zealand, England, Germany, Japan, Hong Kong, and Tahiti. Hoe (pronounced "hoh-eh") is the Hawaiian word for "paddle".

Canoes launch from the Hale o Lono Harbor off the west side of Molokai and travel approximately 41 miles across the Kaiwi Channel to Fort DeRussy beach, Waikiki, in Honolulu. The channel is said to be one of the most treacherous spans of ocean in the world, with the current record time for the passage being under 5 hours.

== Canoes ==
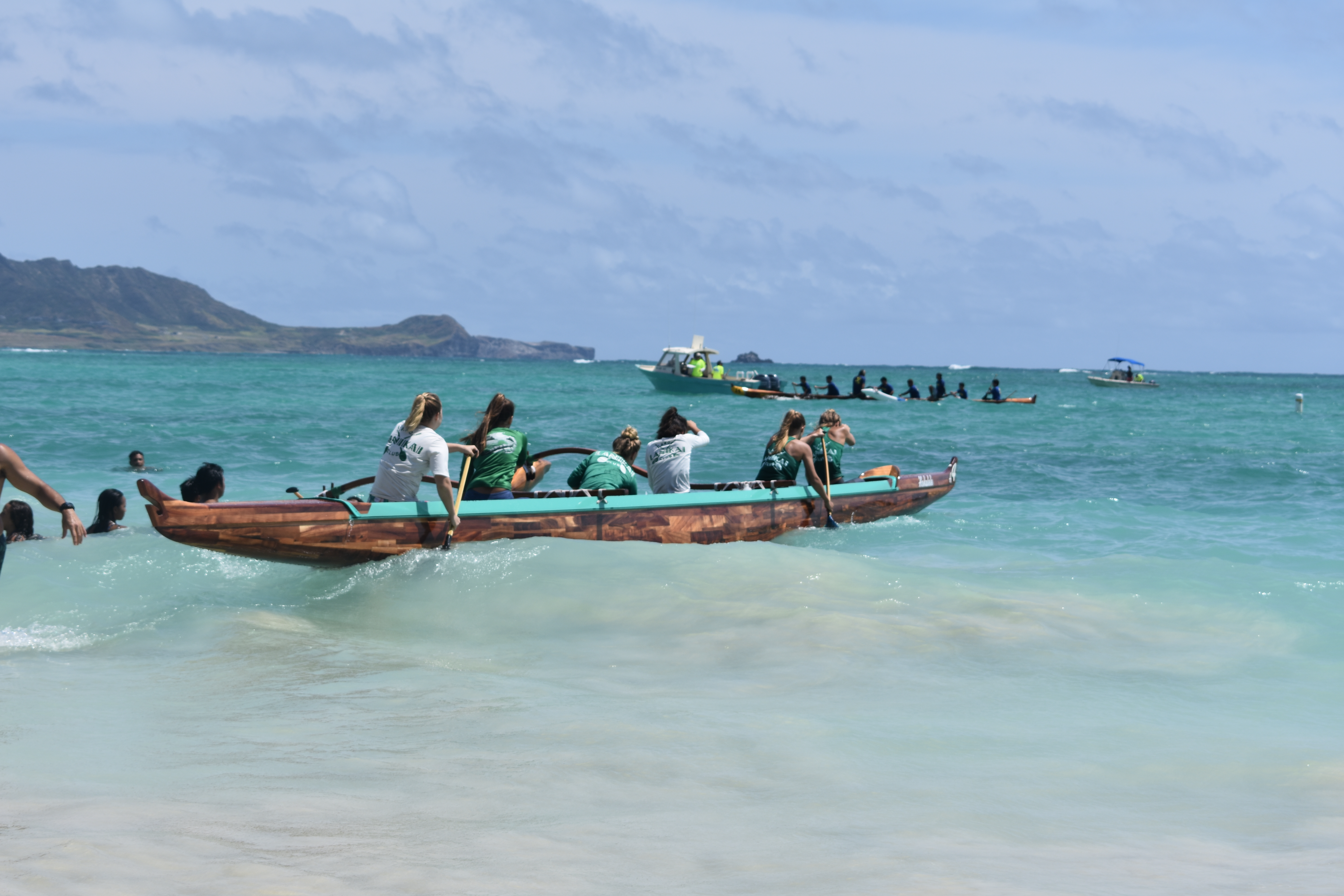
Koa wood canoe used to race in the Molokai Hoe

The canoes used for the race are roughly 40 feet long by about 2 feet wide with 6 seats and weigh about 400 lbs each. Each canoe is stabilized by an ama, a 10 foot long float connected to the canoe by two wooden struts called iako.

== Teams ==
Six paddlers sit evenly spaced inside the canoe. A steersman sits at the back and controls the canoe's course with his paddle. The person in the lead seat sets the pace. All paddlers except for the steersman stroke on alternate sides of the canoe. At predetermined intervals, the person sitting in the second seat calls for paddlers to switch sides.

Early race crews consisted of 6 men who paddled the entire distance. Today's crews consist of 9 members and 10 for masters (40+), of which those not paddling follow in an escort boat. Crew changes occur every 20–30 minutes in mid-channel. During these changes, paddlers exit the canoe on one side while their relief enters from the other side.

== History ==
The first contest, held in October 1952, consisted of three competing koa wood outrigger canoes of six men each. The course at that time was 38 miles long, starting from Molokai’s northwestern Kawakiu Bay. The first canoe reached the Waikiki finish line 8 hours and 55 minutes later.

== Na Wahine O Ke Kai (Women of the Sea) ==
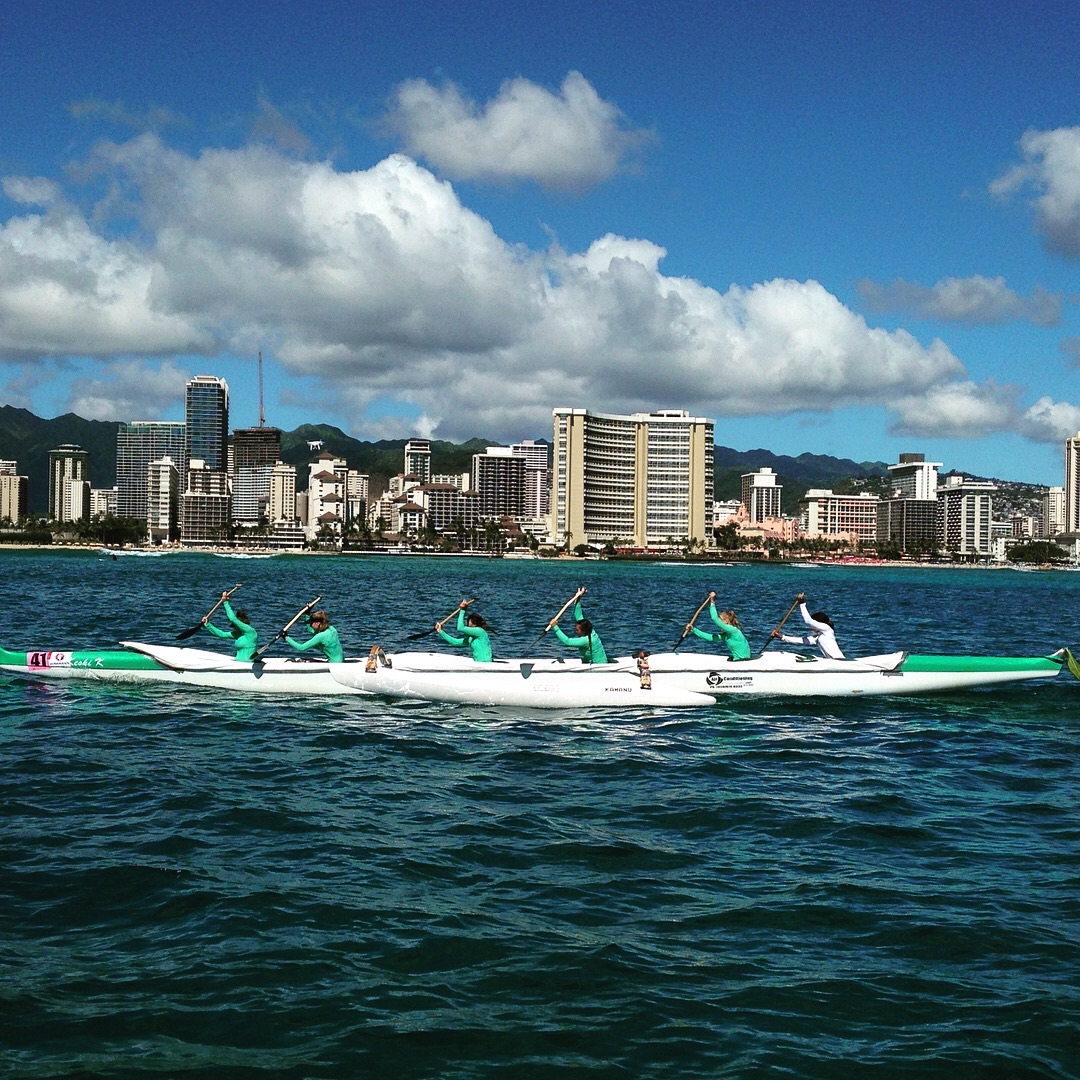
Lanikai Canoe Club woman's youth team winning the 2017 Youth Na Wahine O Ke Kai

A women's equivalent of the Molokai Hoe was proposed two years after the first men's race, but coaches and officials believed the Kaiwi Channel was too treacherous for women to participate. For the next 27 years woman were restricted from attempting to cross the Kaiwi Channel. In October of 1975, two crews of 18 woman each made the first unofficial crossing. The woman came from several different canoe clubs including Healani, Lanikai, Kailua, and Outrigger Canoe clubs. One team was known as Onipaa, Hawaiian for steadfast, and was coached by Richard "Babe" Bell. The Healani crew won the race, with a time of 7 hours, 19 minutes and 20 seconds. As a result of the success of the first womans race, four years later the first officially organized Na Wahine O Ke Kai occurred on October 15, 1979. Since then, the women's race attracts up to 80 crews and 700 paddlers each year. The women's race also covers a 41-mile stretch, starting at Hale O Lono at Molokai's southeast corner and finishing at the Hilton Hotel on Oahu. The current women's race record is a little under 5 1/2 hours.
