= Lahaina Roads =

Channel of the Pacific Ocean in the Hawaiian Islands

Approximate location of the Lahaina Roads within the Hawaiian archipelago.

Lahaina Roads, also called the Lahaina Roadstead, is an anchorage in the ʻAuʻau Channel lying off the town of Lahaina on the island of Maui in the Hawaiian archipelago and U.S. state of Hawaii. It lies in the lee of the West Maui Mountains, with the surrounding islands of Lānaʻi (and to a lesser extent, Molokaʻi and Kahoʻolawe) adding to its general shelter from dangerous winds and large waves. It is most vulnerable to winds and waves from the south in the long open fetch between southern Maui and Kahoʻolawe, as during a "Kona storm" from that direction. While protected from the trade winds (that hit the opposite side of West Maui) it is also subject to frequent heavy gusts and short sharp chop due to thermally induced gusts driven offshore from the West Mauis, and occasional wraparound from heavy winds in the Pailolo Channel between Maui and Molokai.

The Roads lie in the Pacific Ocean in the area 20°52′0″N 156°44′0″W. Through the 1940s, it was an alternative anchorage to Pearl Harbor for the U.S. Pacific Fleet. The possibility that elements of the Pacific Fleet would have been dispersed there was taken seriously in the plan of the Kido Butai (the Japanese naval strike force) for the attack on Pearl Harbor in 1941. Scout planes were dispatched from the fleet, and I class submarines were sent to Lahaina Roads to reconnoiter the anchorage, which proved empty, with the entire U.S. fleet congregated at Pearl Harbor.
