= Burghausen =

Burghausen may refer to several places in Germany:

- Burghausen, Altötting, a town in southeastern Bavaria
  - Burghausen Castle
- Burghausen bei Münnerstadt, part of Münnerstadt in northern Bavaria
- Burghausen bei Freising, part of Kirchdorf an der Amper in central Bavaria
- Burghausen bei Schweinfurt, part of Wasserlosen in northern Bavaria
- Burghausen (Leipzig), a suburb of Leipzig city in Saxony.
- SV Wacker Burghausen, a German football team.
