= North Channel =

North Channel may refer to:

- North Channel (Great Britain and Ireland)
- North Channel (Ontario), body of water along the north shore of Lake Huron, Canada
- North Channel, part of the Penang Strait
- Canal du Nord, France

== See also ==
- North Canal (disambiguation)
