= Rottnest Channel Swim =

Open sea swimming event between Perth and Rottnest Island

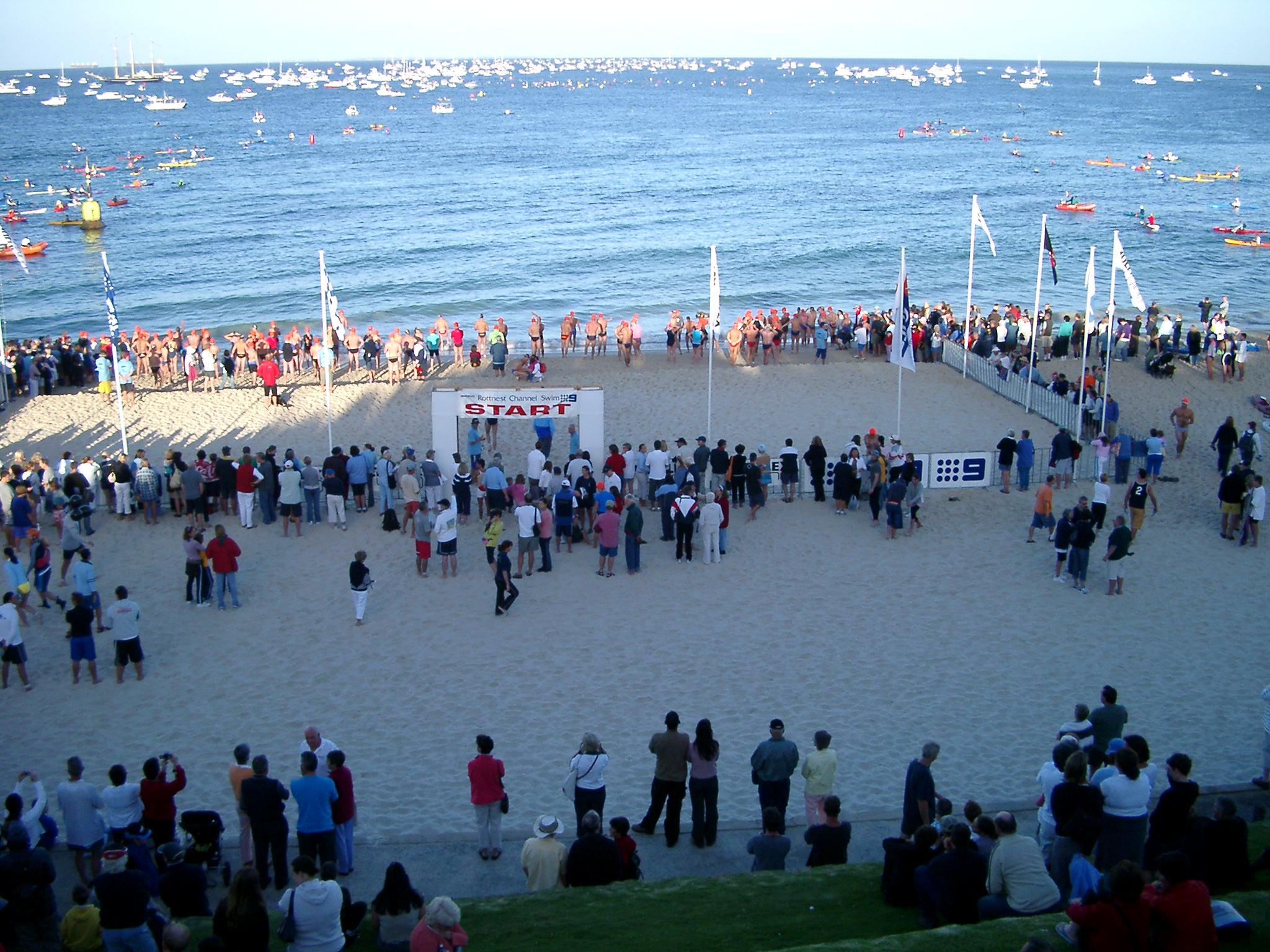
The start of one wave of the Rottnest Channel Swim, 2004

The Rottnest Channel Swim is an annual open water swimming event from Cottesloe Beach through Gage Roads to Rottnest Island, off the coast of Western Australia.

== Format ==
The distance is 19.7 km (12.2 mi) and it is one of the largest open water swimming events in the world, with 2,400 swimmers participating in the 2015 event.

It is held in February each year and is open to solo swimmers and teams of two or four. A second event, "Champions of the Channel" for elite solo swimmers, was introduced in 2016. The "Lavan Legal Charity Challenge" is an exclusive challenge for 30 teams of four for those who wish to fundraise money for a charity of their choice while competing for the Lavan Legal Charity Challenge Cup.

== History ==
When Rottnest Island was used as a prison it was rumoured that some of the prisoners swam back to the mainland, although there is no proof that any did. However, some may have crossed by resting on Carnac and Garden Islands. The first documented crossing by a swimmer was Gerd Von Dincklage-Schulenburg, 24 January 1956, in 9 hours and 45 minutes. As of October 2016, von Dinklage was aged 87 and living in the German town of Dörentrup.

=== First races - early years ===
Von Dincklages' swim led the Weekend Mail newspaper to hold the first organised race to the island later that year, in March 1956, which was completed by four participants. In the years to come, the first woman to swim to the island was 23-year-old Lesley Cherriman on 13 April 1969. She swam from Natural Jetty to North Mole and became the first female to complete a crossing, a feat she repeated on 18 February 1970 and again on 4 April 1971 from the mainland to Rottnest.

In 1990, The Rottnest Channel Swim Association (RCSA) was formed with John Whitehead as its first president. Despite the modest success of the 1956 event, another organised race to the island would not be held until 23 February 1991, with sixteen solo swimmers and seven teams competing, a total of 44 swimmers. The solo event was won in 4:30:03 by Peter Galvin. The success of the swim led to it becoming an annual event. In 1994, Kutraleeswaran from Tamil Nadu, India became the youngest swimmer to ever compete in the race, who completed the swim at the age of 13.

By 1996, the race had 52 solos, 34 duos, and 135 teams for a total of 660 swimmers. David O'Brien was winner, with Brian Parker second, and Shelley Taylor-Smith third. The RCSA president was John Guilfoyle. In 1998 the Rottnest Channel Swim had 1,150 participants, and officially became the world's biggest open water swimming event.

=== 2000 to 2019 ===
In 2001, the history books were re-written when 2,022 people swam the Channel. The Channel Swim had grown so large, an event management consultant was hired to assist volunteers in running the event. Royal Life Saving Western Australia began assisting the RCSA. It was this year that Travis and Jarrad Nederpelt set the duo race record with a time of 3:55:54.

In 2004 swimmers began to be put into categories, with only 100 allowed to start at a time. The team record was also lowered to 3:43:02. Due to the popularity of the race, and the number of support boats for the now 2,300 entrants, a ballot has been held since 2006 to limit the number of participants in the water at the same time.

In 2007, the race was cancelled due to poor weather conditions caused by cyclonic activity in the north west of Western Australia. It was the first time the event had been cancelled in its history.

In 2013, swimsuit regulations were introduced which comply with FINA's open water swimming rules.The RCSA was successful in increasing the number of boats in the water on event day which resulted in more swimmers participating. All finishing swimmers completed the swim well before the final cut-off time and earlier than the 2012 event.

In 2014, the first Welcome to Country was conducted by Ingrid Comming at the pre-race briefing held at Challenge Stadium (now HBF Stadium) and Professor Len Collard performed a second ceremony at Cottesloe Beach on race day.

In 2015, the swim celebrated its 25th anniversary, with one of the highlights being the release of a commemorative book. With the event outgrowing the finish line at the Hotel Jetty, the finish was relocated to the grassed area near the Fuel Jetty, which required a 20m ramp to be built over the dunes.

In 2016, the inaugural Champions of the Channel event was held, with Ben Freeman as the first male solo in 4:18:28 and Jaime Bowler as first female solo in 4:42:16. The Premier of Western Australia, Colin Barnett, celebrated his 20th year as the official starter of the race. Tandem solos (two solos sharing one boat) were introduced.

2018 was an eventful year, with records broken, a boat sinking, a propeller strike, a 3:30pm finish and the event's first-ever shark sighting evacuation. Favourable conditions led to records tumbling with Solomon Wright setting a new solo race record of 3:59:28. The prior record was set in 2000 by Mark Saliba at 4:00:15. The female solo race record of 4:21:55 was set by Heidi Gan and the male team record was broken by Reilly Kennedy, Callum Lauriston, Nicholas Rollo and William Rollo in 3:36:36.

=== 2020 to present ===
Despite the onset of the global COVID-19 pandemic, the 30th channel swim was still held on 22 February 2020. The line honours winner was Dutchman Lars Bottelier, finishing in 4 hours, 18 minutes and 26 seconds. William Rollo finished in second place in 4:22:16 and Kyle Lee finished third in 4:25:30. The first female solo swimmer across the line was Zoe Whitfield, of NSW in a time of 4:48:09, just ahead of Josie Page in second place at 4:48:42. In 2018 and 2019 Page finished in third place.

On 20 February 2021, more than 2,500 swimmers – aged between 14 and 76 – dived into the surf at Cottesloe Beach for 31st channel swim. Andrew Donaldson was the first to finish, less than a year after his return to Perth in the middle of the coronavirus pandemic. Donaldson crossed the line in a time of 4:04:30, more than six minutes in front of second finisher William Rollo. Chloe Truscott was the fastest woman to complete the 19.7 km swim in a time of 4:33:20. She was seven minutes in front of her nearest female competitor, Josie Page. Winners of the Duo category were Kaiden Richings and Thomas Davis, two 16-year olds from Bunbury, in a time of 4:19:38. Swimclan Big Orse's took out the team category in 4:14:37.

In 2022, Kyle Lee and Chloe Truscott were solo winners in times of 4:05:19 and 4:42:43 respectively. In 2023, records tumbled with Bailey Armstrong taking first place in a record 3:48:14, and Chloe Truscott finishing with a record 4:14:13. Four high profile swimmers, who have competed in the Olympics and Commonwealth Games, Mack Horton, Cody Simpson, Josh Edwards-Smith and Bowen Gough, also broke the team record in a time of 3:33:49.

The 2024 event was abandoned four hours into the race due to dangerous weather conditions that saw several participants rescued and four sent to hospital. Just five swimmers reached the finish line before the swim was cancelled. It was only the second time the event had been cancelled after the 2007 swim had been cancelled for similar reasons. The 2026 event was cancelled the day before the event due to forecast poor swimming conditions.

== Solo winners ==
Rottnest Channel Swim Solo Winners
Year	Male	Time	Female	Time	Remarks
1956	Trevor Seaborn	07:36:26	-	-	
1987	Ken Patrick	05:20:00	-	-	
1988	-	-	-	-	
1989	Col Levison	04:57:00	-	-	
1990	Gary McKeon	05:47:00	-	-	
1991	Peter Galvin	04:30:03	Nancy Warnock	05:20:04	
1992	Dieter Gebauer	04:49:49	Tamara Bruce	04:13:58	
1993	David O'Brien	04:02:08	Tamara Bruce	04:10:03	
1994	David O'Brien	04:30:06	Tamara Bruce	04:59:23	
1995	David O'Brien	04:22:24	Tamara Bruce	04:50:10	
1996	David O'Brien	04:19:36	Shelley Taylor-Smith	04:33:21	
1997	Grant Robinson	04:08:20	Shelley Taylor-Smith	04:34:58	
1998	Grant Robinson	04:24:33	Tracey Knowles	04:37:45	
1999	Mark Saliba	04:33:30	Kelly Driffield	04:47:17	
2000	Mark Saliba	04:00:15	Bronwen Whitehead	04:25:53	
2001	Tim Hewitt	04:59:58	Penny Palfrey	04:36:31	
2002	Mark Saliba	04:08:34	Melissa Benson	04:39:21	
2003	Michael Ormsby	05:57:35	Melissa Benson	05:46:28	
2004	Mark Saliba	04:02:44	Penny Palfrey	05:12:42	
2005	Jarrad Nederpelt	04:10:14	Jaime Bowler	04:30:31	
2006	Deke Zimmerman	05:01:43	Melissa Benson	05:16:34	
2007	John Edwards	05:28:18	Penny Palfrey	04:41:13	
2008	David Cox	04:46:34	Melissa Benson	04:41:27	
2009	David Cox	04:40:44	Jaime Bowler	04:56:18	
2010	Deane Pieters	04:41:35	Louise Stevenson	05:07:21	
2011	Tim Hewitt	04:50:49	Louise Stevenson	04:56:42	
2012	Jarrad Lawford	04:29:22	Jessica Walker	04:44:06	
2013	Jeremy Brooke-Smith	04:34:37	Jessica Walker	04:47:54	
2014	Paul Laver	04:14:04	Elizabeth Bellis	04:52:32	
2015	Kane Radford	04:25:59	Grace van der Byl	05:03:17	
2016	Benjamin Freeman	04:18:27	Jaime Bowler	04:42:15	
2017	Jarrod Poort	04:12:22	Rebekah Weller	04:52:03	
2018	Solomon Wright	03:59:28	Heidi Gan	04:21:55	First sub-4 hour solo swim
2019	Sam Sheppard	04:11:22	Jaime Bowler	04:44:41	
2020	Lars Bottelier	04:18:26	Zoe Whitfield	04:48:42	
2021	Andrew Donaldson	04:04:30	Chloe Truscott	04:33:20	
2022	Kyle Lee	04:05:19	Chloe Truscott	04:42:43	
2023	Bailey Armstrong	03:48:14	Chloe Truscott	04:14:31	New Male and Female Records
2024	-	-	-	-	Abandoned due to poor weather
2025	Max Coten	04:02:15	Bianca Monaco	04:18:75	
2026	-	-	-	-	Cancelled due to poor weather
