= Oceans Seven =

Marathon swimming challenge

Oceans seven

The Oceans Seven is a marathon swimming challenge consisting of seven open water channel swims. It was devised in 2008 as the swimming equivalent of the Seven Summits mountaineering challenge. It comprises the North Channel, the Cook Strait, the Molokaʻi Channel, the English Channel, the Catalina Channel, the Tsugaru Strait and the Strait of Gibraltar.

The record for the fastest cumulative time for the completion of the 7 swims is held by Scot Andrew Donaldson, with a total swim time of 63 hours, 2 minutes.

The record for the fastest completion of all seven swims is held by Bulgarian Petar Stoychev who achieved it in 173 days, completing on 14 August 2024.

The record for the youngest ever person to complete all 7 swims is held by New Zealander Caitlin O'Reilly who was 20 years, 7 months, and 15 days old upon completion.

== List of Oceans Seven swims ==
- The North Channel: between Northern Ireland and Scotland, 34.5 kilometres (18.6 nmi)
- The Cook Strait: between New Zealand’s North and South Islands, 22.5 kilometres (12.1 nmi)
- The Molokaʻi Channel (also known as the Kaiwi Channel): between Moloka’i and O’ahu, 42 kilometres (23 nmi)
- The English Channel: between England and France, 33 kilometres (18 nmi)
- The Catalina Channel: between Santa Catalina Island and Los Angeles, 32.3 kilometres (17.4 nmi)
- The Tsugaru Strait: between the Japanese islands of Honshu and Hokkaido, 19.5 kilometres (10.5 nmi)
- The Strait of Gibraltar: between Spain and Morocco, 14.4 kilometres (7.8 nmi)

== List of successful completions ==
The LongSwims Database maintains a list of swimmers who have completed the challenge:

| | Name | Date completed | Nation | Notes |
|---|---|---|---|---|
| 1 | Stephen Redmond | 14 July 2012 | Ireland | First ever to complete all seven swims. Total time 2 years 344 days; cumulative time 104 hours 19 minutes. |
| 2 | Anna-Carin Nordin | 8 July 2013 | Sweden | First woman to complete all seven swims. Total time 2 years 290 days; cumulative time 182 hours 39 mins. |
| 3 | Michelle Macy | 15 July 2013 | United States | First American to complete all seven swims. |
| 4 | Darren Miller | 29 August 2013 | United States | |
| 5 | Adam Walker | 6 August 2014 | United Kingdom | |
| 6 | Kimberley Chambers | 2 September 2014 | New Zealand | |
| 7 | Antonio Argüelles | 3 August 2017 | Mexico | |
| 8 | Ion Lazarenco-Tiron | 27 January 2018 | Republic of Moldova | First from a landlocked country |
| 9 | Rohan Dattatrey More | 9 February 2018 | India | First Asian |
| 10 | Abhejali Bernardová | 24 February 2018 | Czech Republic | |
| 11 | Cameron Bellamy | 21 June 2018 | South Africa | First South African |
| 12 | Lynton Mortensen | 14 November 2018 | Australia | First Australian |
| 13 | Thomas “Fleppy” Pembroke | 14 December 2018 | Australia | |
| 14 | Nora Toledano Cadena | 30 March 2019 | Mexico | |
| 15 | Mariel Hawley Dávila | 30 March 2019 | Mexico | |
| 16 | André Wiersig | 9 June 2019 | Germany | |
| 17 | Elizabeth Fry | 25 August 2019 | United States | |
| 18 | Attila Mányoki | 26 August 2019 | Hungary | Fastest cumulative time (64 hours 35 minutes) until Donaldson, 2023 |
| 19 | Jonathan Ratcliffe | 10 December 2019 | United Kingdom | |
| 20 | Jorge Crivillés | 1 January 2020 | Spain | First Spaniard |
| 21 | Adrian Sarchet | 29 February 2020 | Guernsey | First Channel Islander. |
| 22 | Prabhat Koli | 1 March 2023 | India | |
| 23 | Dina Levačić | 14 March 2023 | Croatia | First Croat, youngest (27 years) |
| 24 | Herman van der Westhuizen | 16 July 2023 | South Africa | |
| 25 | Andrew Donaldson | 27 July 2023 | United Kingdom | Fastest total time (355 days) until Stoychev, 2024; Fastest cumulative time (63 hours 2 minutes). Note: the previous record for total time was 2 years 60 days. |
| 26 | Stephen Junk | 10 September 2023 | Australia | |
| 27 | Kieron Palframan | 6 October 2023 | South Africa | |
| 28 | Bárbara Hernández | 14 June 2024 | Chile | First South American. |
| 29 | Mark Sowerby | 29 June 2024 | Australia | |
| 30 | Zach Margolis | 13 July 2024 | United States | First openly LGBTQ+ |
| 31 | Paul Georgescu | 27 July 2024 | România | First Romanian |
| 32 | Petar Stoychev | 14 August 2024 | Bulgaria | First Bulgarian. Fastest total time (173 days from 14 March to 2 September 2024: Stoychev repeated his English Channel swim after completing Oceans Seven to reduce total time) |
| 33 | Nathalie Pohl | 15 September 2024 | Germany | First German woman. |
| 34 | Caitlin O'Reilly | 24 October 2024 | New Zealand | Youngest ever swimmer to complete the Oceans Seven at 20 years, 7 months, and 15 days. |
| 35 | Ryan Utsumi | 18 April 2025 | United States | |
| 36 | Marcia Cleveland | 20 May 2025 | United States | |
| 37 | Eduardo Collazos Valle | 20 June 2025 | Peru | |
| 38 | Robert Woodhouse | 7 July 2027 | New Zealand | |
| 39 | Alessandra Rossi Cima | 19 July 2025 | Brasil | |
| 40 | Bengisu Avcı | 4 August 2025 | Türkiye | First Turkish swimmer. Cumulative time (73 hours 16 minutes) |
| 41 | Simon Olliver | 30 August 2025 | New Zealand | |
| 42 | Joanne Norman | 2 March 2026 | Australia | |
| 43 | Andreas Waschburger | 4 September 2025 | Germany | |
| 44 | Paul Leonard | 19 June 2026 | United Kingdom | Cookiecutter shark bite survivor (Molokai March 25) |
| 45 | Grainne Moss Gunn | 19 June 2026 | Ireland | |
| 46 | Karen Ennis | 19 June 2026 | United Kingdom | |
| 47 | Rob Lea | 29 June 2026 | United States | First person to complete the Seven Summits and the Oceans Seven. |
| 48 | Anshuman Jhingran | 30 June 2026 | India | |
| 49 | Toni Enderli | 7 June 2026 | Switzerland | |

== See also ==
- Long-distance swimming
- Open water swimming
- Triple Crown of Open Water Swimming
