= Triple Crown of Open Water Swimming =

Marathon swimming challenge

Triple Crown crossings

The Triple Crown of Open Water Swimming is a marathon swimming challenge consisting of three historically important swims:

1. The English Channel, 33 kilometres (21 mi) between France and England
2. The Catalina Channel, 32.5 kilometres (20.2 mi) between Catalina Island and the California mainland
3. The 20 Bridges Swim (formerly known as Manhattan Island Swim), a 48.5-kilometre (30.1 mi) circumnavigation of Manhattan Island, New York City.

As of October 2025, 400 swimmers had earned this distinction.

== Double Triple Crown ==
Swimmers who have completed two swims each of the English Channel, Catalina, and Manhattan are said to have achieved the Double Triple Crown. Antonio Argüelles from Mexico was the first swimmer to achieve this, with his first Triple Crown coming in 1999 and the second in 2009.

Swimmers who have achieved the Double Triple Crown are:

| Swimmer | Country | First Triple Crown | Second Triple Crown |
|---|---|---|---|
| Antonio Argüelles | (Mexico) | 1999 | 2009 |
| Tina Neill | (United States) | 2008 | 2012 |
| Penny Palfrey | (Australia) | 2010 | 2015 |
| Elizabeth Fry | (United States) | 2009 | 2016 |
