= Channels of the Hawaiian Islands =

Names of the channels of water between the Hawaiian Islands

Channels of the Hawaiian Islands

In an archipelago like the Hawaiian Islands the water between islands is typically called a channel or passage. Described here are the channels between the islands of Hawaii, arranged from northwest to southeast.

== Kaulakahi Channel ==
The Kaulakahi Channel separates the islands of Niʻihau and Kauaʻi. It is 17 miles (27 km) wide. Kaulakahi translates to "the single flame (streak of color)."

== Kaʻieʻie Waho Channel ==
The Kaʻieʻie Waho Channel, also called the Kauaʻi Channel, separates the islands of Kauaʻi and Oʻahu, at a distance of 72 miles (116 km). Kaʻieʻie Waho means "Outer Kaʻieʻie," named after the ʻieʻie vine (Freycinetia arborea). The maximum depth of the channel is over 11,000 feet (3,400 m).

== Kaiwi Channel ==
The Kaiwi Channel (also known as the Molokai Channel) separates the islands of Oʻahu and Molokaʻi, and is 26 miles (42 km) wide. Maximum depth is 2,300 feet (700 m). Ka Iwi means "the bone."

The channel hosts the Molokaʻi Hoe and Nā Wāhine O Ke Kai outrigger canoe races, which together drew more than 100 crews in 2024, as well as the Molokai to Oahu Paddleboard World Championships race. Swimming the channel is one of the seven challenges in the Oceans Seven open water swimming series.

== Kalohi Channel ==
The Kalohi Channel is the stretch of water separating Lānaʻi and Molokaʻi. Depth of water in this channel is about 260 feet (79 m) and width is 9.3 miles (15.0 km). This is one of the less treacherous channels between islands in the archipelago, although strong winds and choppy sea conditions are frequent. Kaiolohia Beach on the Lānaʻi coast is also known as "Shipwreck Beach" because of a wreck on the reef there. Kalohi means "the slowness."

== Pailolo Channel ==
The Pailolo Channel separates the islands of Molokaʻi and Maui. Some 8.4 miles (13.5 km) at its narrowest.

== ʻAuʻau Channel ==
The ʻAuʻau Channel is one of the most protected areas of ocean in the Hawaiian Islands, lying between Lānaʻi and Maui. The channel is also protected by Molokaʻi to the north, and Kahoʻolawe to the south. The depth of the channel reaches 108 feet (33 m), and its width is 8.8 miles (14.2 km). ʻAuʻau channel is a whale-watching center in the Hawaiian Islands. Humpback whales migrate approximately 3,500 miles (5,600 km) from Alaskan waters each autumn and spend the northern hemisphere winter months in the protected waters of the channel.

ʻAuʻau translates to "to take a bath," referring to its calm bath-like conditions.

== Kealaikahiki Channel ==
The Kealaikahiki Channel is the 17 miles (27 km) channel between Lānaʻi and Kahoʻolawe. It literally means "the road to Tahiti", both figuratively and literally, as Tahiti lies generally southward of its orientation. Known informally as the "Tahiti Express" for its strength in that direction.

== ʻAlalākeiki Channel ==
The ʻAlalākeiki Channel separates the islands of Kahoʻolawe and Maui, at a distance of 7 miles (11 km). ʻAlalākeiki means "crying baby."

== ʻAlenuihāhā Channel ==
The ʻAlenuihāhā separates the island of Hawaiʻi and the island of Maui. The maximum depth of this channel is 6,100 feet (1,900 m), and the channel is 30 miles (48 km) wide. There is a significant wind funnel effect in the channel, which is subject to scientific investigations. ʻAlenuihāhā means "great billows smashing."ʻAlenuihāhā is more correctly literally translated to ʻAle = cresting, rippling, to form waves; nui = big, large; hāhā = to breathe or blow hard

== Minor channels and alternate names ==
=== Lahaina Roads ===
The middle of the ʻAuʻau channel off Lahaina is known as the Lahaina Roads. Once filled with whalers when Lahaina was a capital for that industry, Lahaina Roads were later adopted as an alternate anchorage for the main U.S. Pacific Fleet based at Pearl Harbor. However, Lahaina was not used, and the bulk of the fleet remained moored in Pearl Harbor. The Roads are still a common moorage for oceangoing cruise ships and naval vessels of many flags, including the U.S., whose passengers and crews add to the tourists visiting the island.

=== Kumukahi Channel ===
The Kumukahi Channel separates the islands of Niʻihau and Lehua. Kumukahi means "first beginning".

=== Hoʻomoʻa Channel ===
The Hoʻomoʻa Channel separates the islands of Lehua and Nīhoa. Hoʻomoʻa means "to cook".

=== Hawaiʻiloa Channel ===
The Hawaiʻiloa Channel to the northwest of the islands of Nīhoa. Named after Hawaiʻiloa, hero of an ancient Hawaiian legend about the settling of the Hawaiian Islands.

== Sources ==
- Mehaffy, Carolyn; Mehaffy, Bob (2006). Cruising Guide to the Hawaiian Islands. Arcata, CA: Paradise Cay Publications. ISBN 978-0-939837-73-1.
- Pukui, Mary Kawena; Elbert, Samuel H.; Mookini, Esther T. (1974). Place Names of Hawaii. Honolulu: University of Hawaii Press. ISBN 978-0-8248-0524-1.
