= Tsugaru Strait =

Strait between Honshu and Hokkaido, Japan

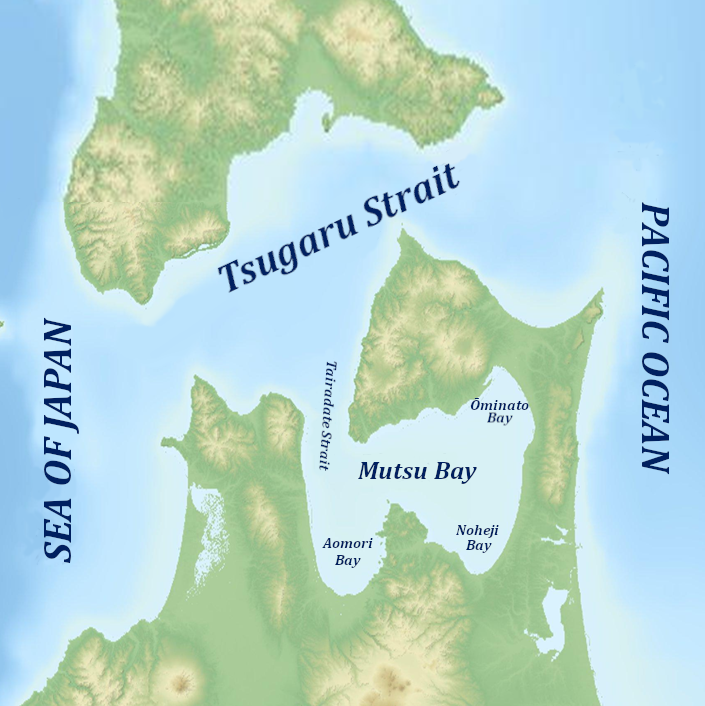
- Tsugaru Strait. Honshu is south, Hokkaido north.

- Location within Japan
- Location: Japan
- Coordinates: 41°29′57″N 140°36′57″E
- Etymology: Tsugaru clan
- Max. depth: 200 m (660 ft)

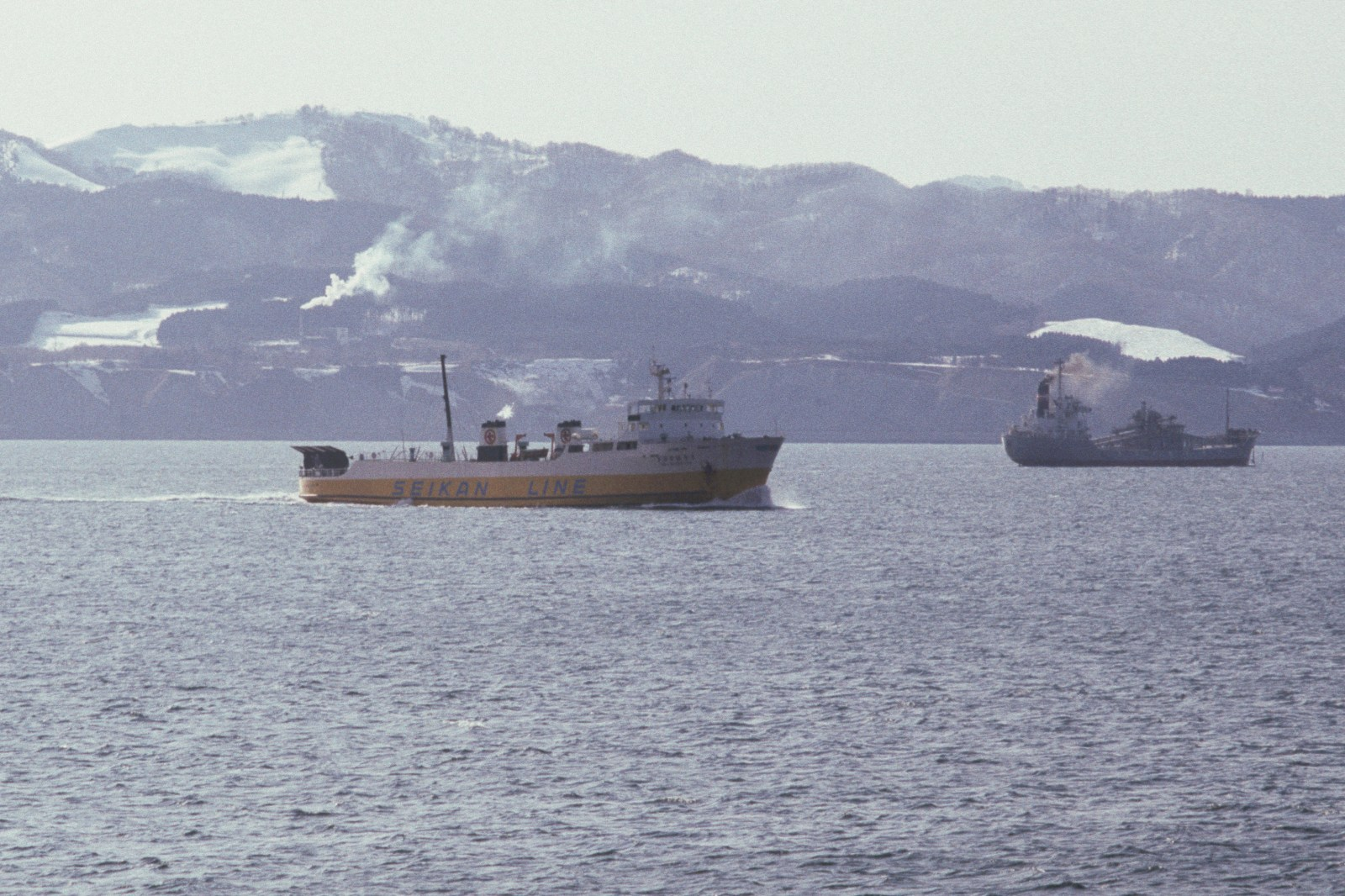
Ships on the Tsugaru Strait

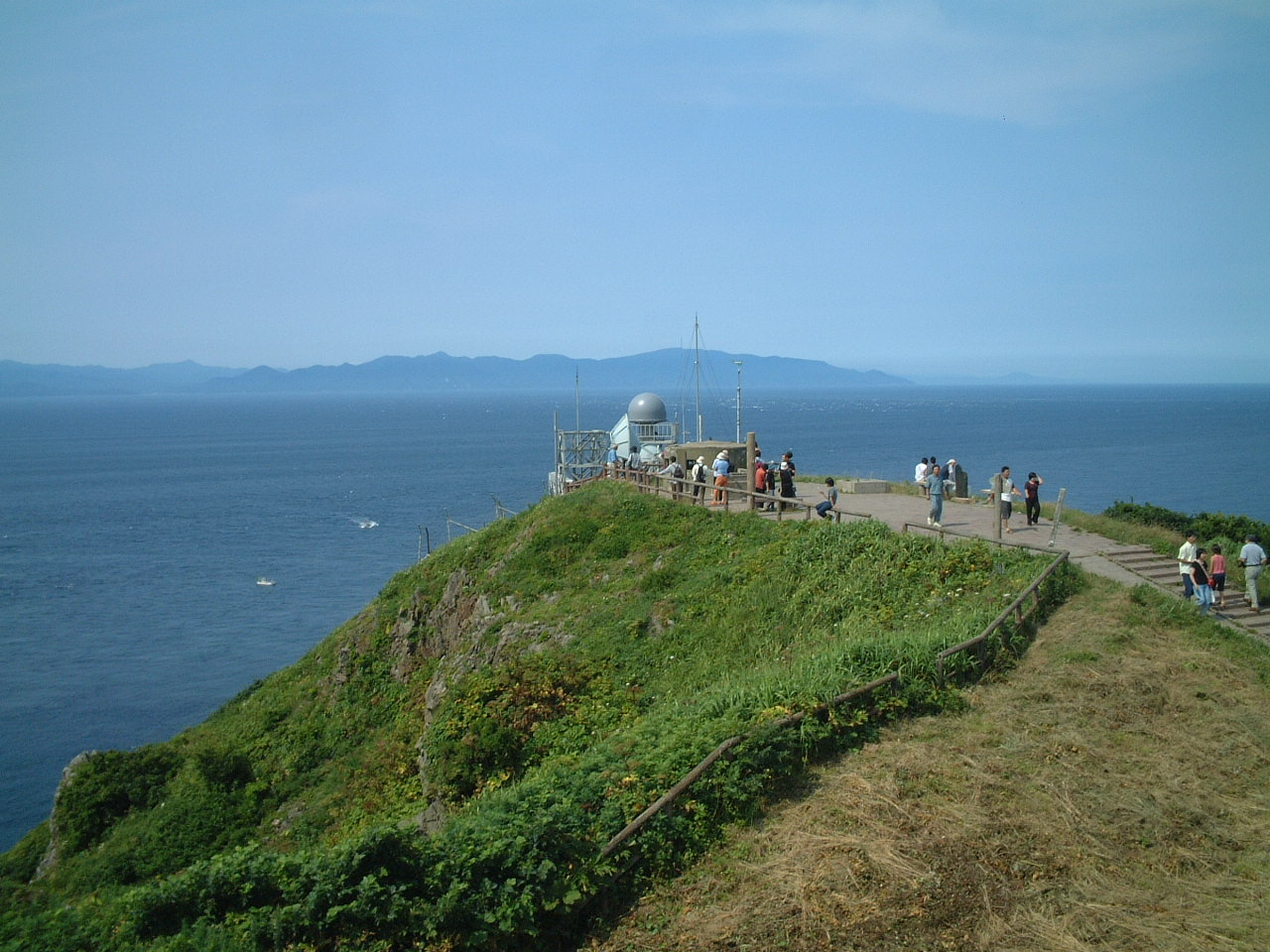
Tappi Misaki Cape

The Tsugaru Strait (津軽海峡, Tsugaru Kaikyō) is a strait between Honshu and Hokkaido in northern Japan connecting the Sea of Japan with the Pacific Ocean. It was named after the western part of Aomori Prefecture. The Seikan Tunnel passes under it at its narrowest point 12.1 miles (19.5 km) between Tappi Misaki on the Tsugaru Peninsula in Aomori Prefecture, Honshu, and Shirakami Misaki on the Matsumae Peninsula in Hokkaido.

Western maps made prior to the 20th century also referred to this waterway as the Strait of Sangar.

Japan's territorial waters extend to three nautical miles (5.6 km) into the strait instead of the usual twelve, reportedly to allow nuclear-armed United States Navy warships and submarines to transit the strait without violating Japan's prohibition against nuclear weapons in its territory. Despite this, the part of the Tsugaru Strait considered to be in international waters is still within Japan's exclusive economic zone, and the Seikan Tunnel remains entirely under Japanese jurisdiction even though part of it is technically outside Japan's territorial waters.

The Tsugaru Strait has eastern and western necks, both approximately 20 km across with maximum depths of 200 m and 140 m respectively.

There are also ferry services that operate across the strait, including the Tsugaru Kaikyō Ferry and the Seikan ferry.

On September 26, 1954, 1,172 people died when the ferry Tōya Maru sank in the strait.

Thomas Blakiston, an English explorer and naturalist, noticed that animals in Hokkaido were related to northern Asian species, whereas those on Honshu to the south were related to those from southern Asia. The Tsugaru Strait was therefore established as a major zoogeographical boundary, and became known as Blakiston's Line.

== See also ==
- Exclusive economic zone of Japan
- Geography of Japan
- Mutsu Bay
- Oceans Seven marathon swimming challenge includes the Tsugaru Strait
