= North Channel (Great Britain and Ireland) =

Strait between north-east Ireland and Scotland

Coordinates: 55°03′27″N 5°37′19″W

- The Sheugh (Scots)
- Sruth na Maoile (Scottish Gaelic)
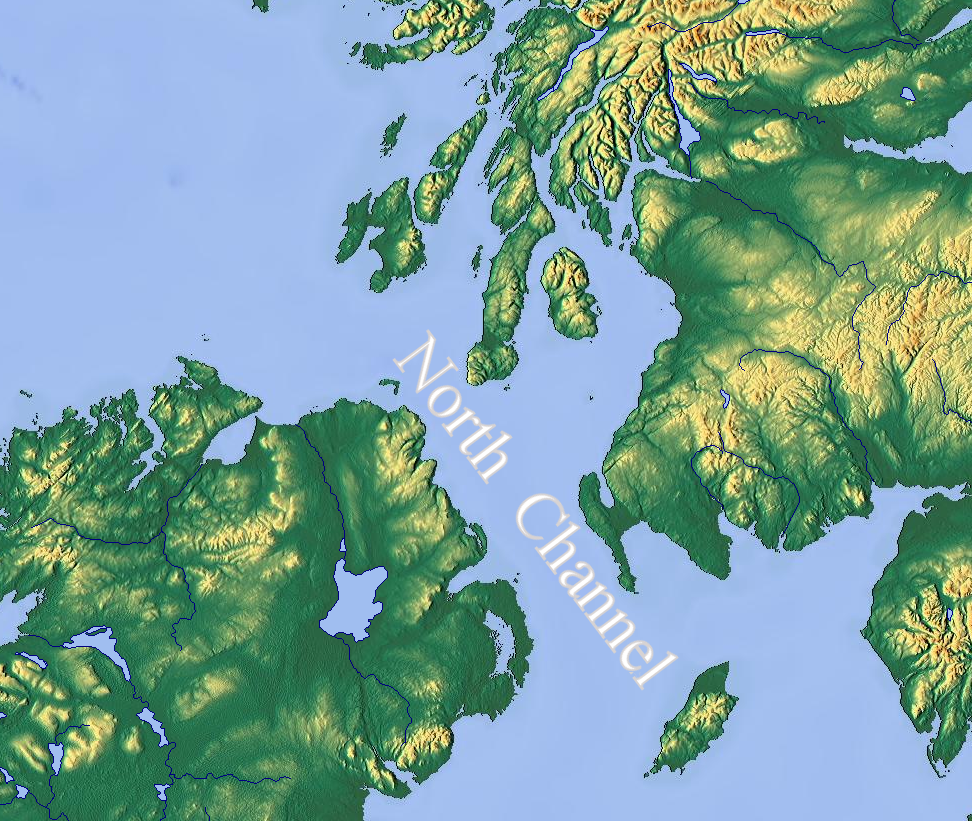
- Interactive map of North Channel
- Type: Strait
- Part of: Irish Sea
- Primary inflows: River Bann, River Foyle, River Clyde, water from Irish Sea
- Primary outflows: North Atlantic Ocean
- Surface area: 160,367 hectares (396,280 acres)
- Salinity: 34–35 psu
- Frozen: Never
- Trenches: Beaufort's Dyke

The North Channel (known in Irish and Scottish Gaelic as Sruth na Maoile, and in Scots as The Sheugh, 'the trench') is the strait between north-eastern Ireland and south-western Scotland. The Firth of Clyde merges with the channel, between the southern tip of the Kintyre peninsula and Corsewall Point on the Rhins of Galloway. Part of the Irish Sea, the channel begins north-west of the Isle of Man and runs north-west into the Atlantic Ocean. Within the channel is Beaufort's Dyke, the deepest part of which is 312 metres (1,024 ft).

== Geography ==
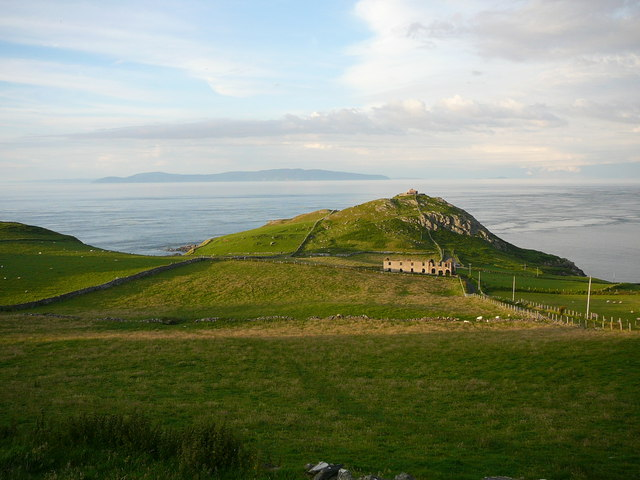
View from Torr Head, County Antrim, to the Mull of Kintyre, looking over the Straits of Moyle.

The North Channel connects the Irish Sea with the Atlantic Ocean and is part of the marine area officially classified as the "Inner Seas off the West Coast of Scotland" by the International Hydrographic Organization (IHO).

The Straits of Moyle (Sruth na Maoile in Irish and Scottish Gaelic) or Sea of Moyle is the name given to the narrowest expanse of sea in the North Channel between north-eastern Northern Ireland's County Antrim and the Mull of Kintyre in south-western Scotland. The narrowest part of the strait is between the Mull of Kintyre and Torr Head, where its width is 19 kilometres (12 mi; 10 nmi), making it possible to see across in clear weather conditions. The straits gave their name to Moyle District Council, a local government area in Northern Ireland, and are famed in Irish Celtic mythology through their association with the Children of Lir.

In the 1800s, this strait was sometimes referred to in general terms as the "Irish Channel". In the 19th century, Alexander Keith Johnston's suggested name St. Patrick's Channel had currency, but it was rejected by the hydrographic department.

The North Channel was a favourite haunt of privateers preying on British merchant shipping in wars until the 19th century; in 1778, during the American Revolutionary War, it was also the site of a naval duel between American captain John Paul Jones's USS Ranger and the Royal Navy's HMS Drake. It is crossed by many ferry services. In 1953, the channel was the scene of a serious maritime disaster, the sinking of the ferry MV Princess Victoria.

== Swimming ==
The Irish Long Distance Swimming Association (ILDSA) has provided authentication observers for swimmers attempting to cross the approximately 35-kilometre (22 mi) span between Northern Ireland and the Mull of Galloway. According to the ILDSA, this was first accomplished in 1947 by Tom Blower. The first two-way crossing was completed by a six-person relay team on 28 July 2015.

The World Open Water Swimming Association note that the North Channel, which it also refers to parenthetically as the North (Irish) Channel, is part of the Ocean's Seven series. This is a set of seven long-distance open-water swims considered the marathon swimming equivalent of the Seven Summits mountaineering challenge.

== Fixed connections ==
In Northern Ireland, Unionist political leaders for decades lobbied the British government to construct a railway tunnel under the Channel, for a better link between Northern Ireland and the rest of the United Kingdom. In August 2007 the Centre for Cross-Border Studies proposed the construction of a 34-kilometre-long (21 mi) long rail bridge or tunnel, estimating that it might cost about £3.5 billion. In the Victorian era, engineers proposed a rail tunnel between Stranraer and Belfast.

In February 2020, the Prime Minister's Office announced that it had initiated work to examine the feasibility of a bridge between Scotland and Northern Ireland. The transport route with the shortest sailing distance is that between Campbeltown on the Kintyre peninsula (about 220 km (140 mi) from Glasgow via minor roads) and Ballycastle, County Antrim (about 90 km (56 mi) from Belfast). Campbeltown is on the eastern side of the Kintyre peninsula, but the western side is only about 16 kilometres (10 mi) from Torr Head coast to coast.

The shortest route between Glasgow and Belfast is the route used by the existing ferry service, that via Portpatrick/Stranraer (about 150 km (93 mi) from Glasgow) and Larne (about 35 km (22 mi) from Belfast), a coast-to-coast distance of 45 kilometres (28 mi). This route would require the bridge towers to be erected through Beaufort's Dyke, a 200–300 m (700–1,000 ft) deep trench, heavily contaminated by 'large quantities' of munitions ('small arms, high explosives and incendiary devices') and nuclear waste that had been dumped until 1950s.

The First Minister of Scotland, Nicola Sturgeon, said her mind was not closed to the idea, but added "if he [the prime minister] has got £20bn to build such a bridge going spare at the moment – that could be spent on more important priorities".

== See also ==
- Seas west of Scotland
- St George's Channel
- Sinking of the ferry MV Princess Victoria in 1953
