= List of North Channel swimmers =

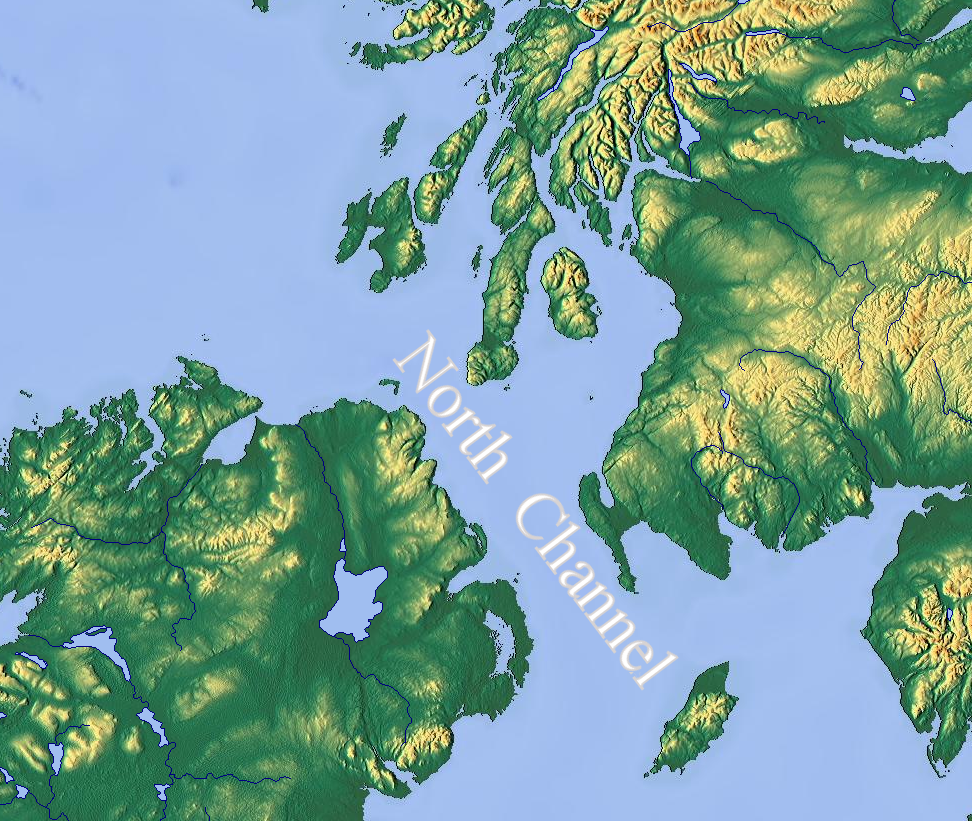
Map of the North Channel

The Irish Long Distance Swimming Association (ILDSA) has provided authentication observers for swimmers attempting to cross the approximately 35-kilometre (22 mi) North Channel between Northern Ireland and the Mull of Galloway. According to the ILDSA, this was first accomplished in 1947 by Tom Blower. The first two-way crossing was completed by a six-person relay team on 28 July 2015.

The North Channel is part of the Ocean's seven, a set of seven long-distance open-water swims considered the marathon swimming equivalent of the Seven Summits mountaineering challenge.

== Solo (including two-way) ==
Date	Name	Nationality	Direction	Duration
28 July 1947	Tom Blower	England	Ireland to Scotland	15 hrs 26 mins
11 September 1970	Kevin Murphy	England	Ireland to Scotland	11 hrs 21 mins
29 August 1971	Kevin Murphy	England	Ireland to Scotland	14 hrs 27 mins
11 August 1973	Ted Keenan	Ireland	Ireland to Scotland	18 hrs 27 mins
22 August 1988	Alison Streeter	England	Ireland to Scotland	09 hrs 53 mins 42 secs
23 August 1988	Margaret Kidd	Scotland	Ireland to Scotland	15 hrs 26 mins 03 secs
25 August 1989	Alison Streeter	England	Scotland to Ireland	10 hrs 04 mins
7 September 1989	Kevin Murphy	England	Scotland to Ireland	17 hrs 17 mins 48 secs
18 August 1997	Alison Streeter	England	Scotland to Ireland	10 hrs 02 mins12 secs
27 July 1999	Paul Lewis	England	Scotland to Ireland	14 hrs 28 mins
21 July 2000	Stephen Price	England	Scotland to Ireland	16 hrs 56 mins
31 July 2004	Colm O Neill	Ireland	Scotland to Ireland	11 hrs 25 mins 05 secs
12 September 2008	Colleen Blair	Scotland	Ireland to Scotland	15 hrs 23 mins 59 secs
31 August 2010	Stephen Redmond	Ireland	Scotland to Ireland	17 hrs 17 mins 01 sec
1 September 2010	Ann Marie Ward	Ireland	Ireland to Scotland	18 hrs 59 mins 26 secs
27 July 2011	Craig Lenning	US	Ireland to Scotland	14 hrs 44 mins 50 secs
2 August 2011	Howard Keech	England	Ireland to Scotland	13 hrs 25 mins
16 June 2013	Fergal Somerville	Ireland	Ireland to Scotland	12 hrs 21 mins
30 July 2013	Milko van Gool	Netherlands	Ireland to Scotland	10 hrs 34 mins
29 August 2013	Darren Miller	US	Ireland to Scotland	11 hrs 16 mins
22 July 2014	Guy Moar	Australia	Ireland to Scotland	11 hrs 10 mins
7 August 2014	Colleen Mallon	Northern Ireland	Ireland to Scotland	09 hrs 56 mins
6 August 2014	Adam Walker	England	Ireland to Scotland	10 hrs 45 mins
2 September 2014	Kimberley Chambers	New Zealand	Ireland to Scotland	13 hrs 6 mins
22 July 2015	Graeme Lowe	Jersey	Ireland to Scotland	12 hrs 27 mins
24 July 2015	Vicky Miller	England	Ireland to Scotland	12 hrs 6 mins
7 August 2015	Rohan Dattaray More	India	Ireland to Scotland	12 hrs 46 mins
7 August 2015	Adrian Sarchet	Guernsey	Ireland to Scotland	14 hrs 13 mins
11 August 2015	Ion Lazarenco	Moldova/Ireland	Ireland to Scotland	16 hrs 23mins
9 September 2015	Tom Pembroke	Australia	Ireland to Scotland	12 hrs
14 July 2016	Cameron Bellamy	South Africa	Ireland to Scotland	12 hrs 16 mins
25 August 2016	Edward Williams	England	Ireland to Scotland	10 hrs 58 mins
24 August 2016	Pat Gallant Charette	US	Ireland to Scotland	14 hrs 22mins
3 August 2017	Antonio Argüelles	Mexico	Ireland to Scotland	13 hrs 32 mins
16 August 2017	Abhejali Bernardova	Czech Republic	Ireland to Scotland	10 hrs 23 mins
25 June 2018	Nicholas Murch	United Kingdom	Ireland to Scotland	11 hrs 48 mins
5 August 2018	Jaroslav Chytil	Czech Republic	Ireland to Scotland	16 hrs 4 mins
5 September 2018	Rachael Elkaim Hanisch	Australia	Ireland to Scotland	10 hrs 32 mins
8 September 2019	Zach Margolis	US	Ireland to Scotland	14 hrs 24 mins 32 secs
1 July 2021	Lauren Lesyna	US	Ireland to Scotland	16 hrs 14 mins 37 secs
21 July 2021	Elaine Burrows Dillane	Ireland	Scotland to Ireland	14 hrs 54 mins 30 secs
19 August 2021	Katherine Chapman	UK	Ireland to Scotland	10 hrs 59 mins 02secs
19 August 2021	Matt Murphy	UK	Ireland to Scotland	12 hrs 35 mins 02secs
29 September 2021	Luca Estrada Pozzi	Italy / US	Ireland to Scotland	13 hrs 37 mins 21 secs
15 September 2021	Stève Stievenart	France	Scotland to Ireland	14 hrs 44 mins 03 secs
9 July 2022	Sarah Thomas	US	Scotland to Scotland	21 hrs 46 mins 38 secs (2-way)
10 July 2022	Andrew Keay	Australia	Ireland to Scotland	14 hrs 30 mins 12 secs
10 July 2022	Barry Murphy	Ireland	Ireland to Scotland	13 hrs 53 mins 34 secs
10 July 2022	Siân Clement	Wales	Ireland to Scotland	12 hrs 45 mins 32 secs
22 July 2022	Grainne Moss	Ireland	Ireland to Scotland	13 hrs 33 mins 36 secs
22 July 2022	Bárbara Hernández	Chile	Ireland to Scotland	12 hrs 19 mins 36 secs
8 August 2022	Alessandra Rossi Cima	Brazil	Ireland to Scotland	12 hrs 21 mins 00 secs
8 August 2022	Callum Eade	New Zealand	Ireland to Scotland	11 hrs 40 mins 10 secs
8 August 2022	Sarah Liles	UK	Ireland to Scotland	12 hrs 54 mins 31 secs
9 August 2022	Jessi Lidstone Harewicz	UK	Ireland to Scotland	18 hrs 15 mins 4 secs
9 August 2022	Sarah Philpott	UK	Ireland to Scotland	16 hrs 21 mins 54 secs
9 August 2022	Aysu Türkoğlu	Turkey	Ireland to Scotland	11 hrs 48 mins 19 secs
23 August 2022	Samuel Abeshouse	Australia	Ireland to Scotland	11 hrs 16 mins
18 September 2022	Victor Pineiro	Argentina	Ireland to Scotland	13 hrs 29 mins
25 August 2022	Paul Georgescu	Romania	Ireland to Scotland	11 hrs 7 mins 3 secs
27 July 2023	Bethany Mitchell	US	Ireland to Scotland	13 hrs 9 mins 21 secs
27 July 2023	Dominic Mudge	UK	Ireland to Scotland	11 hrs 8 mins 24 secs
8 September 2023	Jonty Warneken	UK	Ireland to Scotland	15 hrs 22 mins 41 secs
20 July 2025	Bengisu Avcı	Turkey	Ireland to Great Britain	10 hrs 48 secs
08 July 2026	Alina Jogl	Slovakia	Ireland to Scotland	12 hrs 15 min 55 secs
25 July 2026	Tuna Tunca	Turkey	Ireland to Scotland	~16 hrs
23 August 2026	Divya Mahajan	India	Ireland to Scotland	15 hrs 50 mins

== Relay teams ==
Date	Team Name	Team size	Nation of Origin	Direction	Duration
27 August 1990	Ireland One	6	Ireland	Ireland to Scotland	12 hrs 03 mns 01 sec
14 August 1993	City of Liverpool	6	England	Ireland to Scotland	10 hrs 39 mins 42 secs
23 June 1996	City of Dublin	6	Ireland	Ireland to Scotland	12 hrs 44 mins 56 secs
20 August 1999	The All American	6	US	Scotland to Ireland	13 hrs 11 mins 39 secs
26 August 2002	City of Liverpool	6	England	Scotland to Ireland	12 hrs 47 mins 41 secs
6 July 2004	The Swilly Trio	3	Ireland	Scotland to Ireland	14 hrs 41 mins 14 secs
22 August 2011	Team Camlough Lake	6	Northern Ireland	Ireland to Scotland	12 hrs 21 mins 12 secs
5 July 2014	11 Feet Camlough Lake	6	Northern Ireland	Ireland to Scotland	12 hrs 52 mins 0 secs
7 August 2012	The Machine Men	3	US	Ireland to Scotland	10 hrs 18 mins 0 secs
24 June 2015	Wexford Masters	6	Ireland	Ireland to Scotland	13 hrs 09 mins
28 July 2015	Fast and Frozen	6	Worldwide	Ireland to Scotland to Ireland (two-way relay)	29 hrs 57 mins
7 August 2015	Infinity V	5	Ireland	Ireland to Scotland	13 hrs 15 mins
25 May 2016	Deadly Diamonds	5	Northern Ireland	Ireland to Scotland	10 hrs 20 mins 0 secs
12 June 2016	O W Ladies	5	England	Ireland to Scotland to Ireland (two-way relay)	28 hrs 25 mins
30 June 2016	The Celtic Kippers	6	Ireland	Ireland to Scotland	13 hours 46 mins
25 August 2016	Channel Swimming Crazies	4	Northern Ireland	Ireland to Scotland	09 hours 55 mins 44 secs
