= Fiann Paul =

Icelandic explorer, athlete and artist

Fiann Paul CGeog, Hon.MM
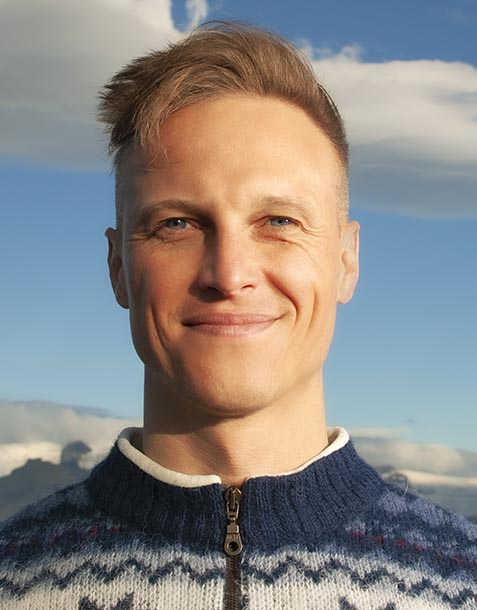
- Born: Paweł Pietrzak; 15 August 1980 (age 46); Warsaw, Poland
- Citizenship: Polish, Icelandic
- Education: C. G. Jung Institute, Zürich (Jungian Analyst)
- Awards: Ocean Explorers Grand Slam (2019)
- Website: fiannpaul.com' rowlaughexplore.com

Fiann Paul (born Paweł Pietrzak; 15 August 1980) is a Polish-Icelandic explorer known for his exploits in ocean rowing.

Paul is the fastest ocean rower (2016) and the most record-breaking ocean rower (2017). In 2019, he led the first human-powered transit (by rowing) across the Drake Passage, and the first human-powered expedition on the Southern Ocean. As of 2020, he is the first and only person to achieve the Ocean Explorers Grand Slam, performing open-water crossings on each of the five oceans using human-powered vessels. He holds overall speed records for rowing the Atlantic, Indian, Pacific and Arctic Oceans.

== Early life and education ==
Fiann Paul was born Paweł Pietrzak on 15 August 1980 in Warsaw, Poland. In the mid-2000s, he moved from his native Poland to Iceland and became an Icelandic citizen, changing his name to Fiann Paul. He currently lives in Reykjavík.

In 2021, Paul completed training to become a Jungian Analyst at the C.G. Jung institute in Zürich. His main focus is the psychology of ultra endurance performance and the psychological dynamics within the psyche of explorers and endurance athletes.

== Ocean rowing ==
Fiann Paul has crossed all five oceans in an unsupported human-powered row boat with world-record-breaking speed, setting the overall speed records for the Atlantic, Indian, Pacific and Arctic Oceans. He achieved the only human-powered crossing of the Southern Ocean and, as a result, no speed record was adjudicated due to lack of competition.

Paul achieved the highest success rate in the history of ocean rowing, measuring the number of attempted-speed-records to successful expeditions. He was on stroke position for each row, the role that sets the boat's pace. His total effort performed in ocean rowing was compared to consecutively running approximately 300 marathons. In an interview with The Washington Times, he mentioned that his resting heart rate during off-shift times throughout the record-breaking crossings was 95 BPM, almost twice the normal resting heart rate.

=== Rowing History ===
==== 2011 ====
In 2011, Paul acted as a stroke of Sara G which earned the title of "the Fastest Boat in ocean rowing history", established an overall speed record for the Atlantic Ocean, and won the Blue Riband Trophy of Ocean Rowing.

==== 2014, 2 oceans ====
In 2014, Paul became the first person to simultaneously hold overall speed records for the fastest rowing across 2 oceans (Atlantic and Indian). In addition to another collision, this time with a blue whale, the critical steering cable broke, which forced the crew to manually steer the boat. After sustaining injuries passing through a hurricane, the crew narrowed down to only 3 rowers.

==== 2016, 3 oceans ====
In 2016, Paul became the only rower ever to achieve all three overall speed records (Atlantic, Indian, Mid-Pacific) and the only rower to hold all three records simultaneously. The achievement was recognized by Guinness World Records.

==== 2017, 4 oceans ====
In 2017, Paul rowed the Arctic Ocean, becoming the first person to row 4 oceans and earning the Arctic Ocean overall speed record. Polar Row I broke the existing Arctic Ocean record by a factor of 3.5, despite being buffeted by headwinds 60% of the time according to Paul. Guinness World Records certified Paul to be "First to row 4 Oceans" and "First to hold current speed records on all 4 oceans".

==== 2019, Ocean Explorers Grand Slam and "The Impossible Row" ====
The Antarctic or "Impossible" Row was conceived in April 2017. Upon completion of Polar Row II in August 2017, in an interview with The New York Times, Paul vowed he would row an even more difficult route. In September 2017, Paul recruited the first team members, Andrew Towne and Jamie Douglas-Hamilton. The row was initially scheduled for December 2018 but was postponed due to lack of availability of an assisting vessel. In January 2019 he recruited Cameron Bellamy and John Petersen, and Colin O'Brady in April 2019. O'Brady joined the project without prior rowing, ocean rowing, or seafaring experience to serve as first mate and aid the project financially.

The row took 12 days, 1 hour and 45 minutes, with the team experiencing sub-zero temperatures, snow, hail, and giant ice bergs unique to Antarctica. The row was completed on 25 December 2019, with the team accomplishing three historical feats: being the first to row across the Drake Passage, the first to row to the Antarctic, and the first to row in the Southern Ocean. The row was the subject of a 2020 Discovery Channel documentary, The Impossible Row.

== Honors and accolades ==
In 2019, Fiann Paul was appointed a coordinator for Ocean Rowing Society International, the governing body for international ocean rowing.

In 2020, he was awarded an Honorary Master Mariner from the Association of Master Mariners at the Gdynia Maritime University in Gdynia, Poland. Master Mariner is the highest seafarer qualification, and in Poland, one needs to study for approximately 8 years to achieve this qualification.

In 2021, Paul pro-bono developed a geodatabase that documents the history of human-power ocean exploration.

=== Other Honors and Awards ===
- Blue Riband Trophy of Ocean Rowing, 2011
- Winner of the Great Pacific Race in classic class, 2016
- Winner of the Great Pacific Race in all classes (against open class), 2016
- Oars of Anders Svedlund from friends and family of Anders Svedlund
- Diploma from Military Personnel of Jan Mayen for accomplishments in ocean rowing

== World Records ==
=== Guinness World's Firsts ===
==== Pioneering and explorations Guinness World's First titles ====
- First to row 4 oceans, 2017
- First to row the Arctic Ocean open waters south to north
- First recorded complete human-powered crossing of the Barents Sea, 2017
- First to row the Arctic Ocean open waters north to south, 2017
- First recorded complete human-powered crossing of the Greenland Sea, 2017
- First to row the Arctic Ocean in both directions, 2017
- First to row across the Drake Passage, 2019
- First to row on the Southern Ocean, 2019
- First to row to the Antarctic continent, 2019
- First to row in both Polar Regions, 2019
- First to row on 5 oceans (first to complete Ocean Explorers Grand Slam), 2019

==== Other Performance Guinness World's First titles ====
- First person to hold simultaneous overall (Note: Overall speed record in ocean rowing stands for the fastest crossing regardless of any additional criteria such as number and type of the crew, class of the boat, hull type, race, exact departure and arrival points, departure date etc. Average overall speed is calculated and compared. The distance used for the overall speed calculation is the straight line distance between the departure and the arrival points, while the actual distance rowed and the actual average speed is usually much higher) speed Guinness World Records for ocean rowing all three oceans (hat-trick): 2016
- First person to twice hold three simultaneous overall ocean rowing speed records on different oceans (hat-trick): 2017
- First to hold current speed records on 4 oceans, 2017

=== Guinness Mosts ===
==== Accumulative Guinness World Records for total number of accomplishments in Ocean Rowing ====
- Most ocean rowing speed records held simultaneously on different oceans (3), 2016
- Most ocean rowing speed records held simultaneously on different oceans, (4), 2017
- Most ocean rowing overall speed records within two consecutive years (2), 2017
- Most Polar Open Water rows completed by a rower (3), 2019
- Most latitude records held by a rower (6), 2019

=== Overall Speed Guinness World Records ===
- Fastest crossing of the Atlantic Ocean, 2011
- Fastest crossing of the Indian Ocean, 2014
- Fastest crossing of the Mid-Pacific Ocean, 2016
- Fastest crossing of the Arctic Ocean, 2017

==== Other Speed Guinness World Records ====
- Highest consecutive number of days rowed a distance over 100 miles a day (12 days), 2011
- Fastest row across the Indian Ocean by a team, 2014

=== Geographical Guinness World Records ===
==== Latitude Guinness World Records ====
- Northernmost latitude (78°15'20'' N) reached by a rowing vessel, 2017
- Northernmost departure point (78°13' N), 2017
- Northernmost latitude reached by a rowing vessel (Arctic ice pack edge - 79°55'50'' N), 2017
- The southernmost start of a rowing expedition, 55° 58′ S
- The southernmost latitude reached by a rowing vessel, 64°14′S

==== Longest distance Guinness World Records ====
- The longest distance rowed on the Arctic Ocean Open Waters within one expedition, 2017
- Longest distance rowed by a crew on the Indian Ocean, 2014
- Longest aggregated distance rowed in the Polar Open Water.

=== Ocean Rowing World Records ===
- Most record-breaking ocean rower
- Most record-breaking ocean crossing, 2017
- Fastest ocean rowing boat in history as compared to the average speed of any row on any ocean, 2011

=== Other world records ===
- Most record-breaking expedition in history, 2017
