= Cameron Bellamy =

South African endurance athlete

- Education: University of Queensland
- Occupation: Endurance athlete

Cameron Bellamy is an endurance athlete from South Africa. He has broken numerous records including being one of six men on a team to row across the Drake Passage in 2019. He also broke the record for the longest ocean channel swim previously held by Chloe McCardel.

== Early life and education ==
Bellamy grew up in Cape Town, South Africa. He attended the University of Queensland in Australia where he earned a Master's Degree.

== Career ==
Bellamy began swimming at the age of 29.

In September 2019, Bellamy completed the longest ocean channel swim on record, making the 151.7 km (94.3 mi) trip from Barbados to St Lucia in 56 hours and 36 minutes. The previous record was held by Chloe McCardel who completed a 124.4 km (77.3 mi) trip approximately five years prior.

Between 13 and 25 December 2019, Bellamy, along with five other men, (Fiann Paul, Andrew Towne, Colin O'Brady, Jamie Douglas-Hamilton, and John Peterson) rowed across the Drake Passage in a 29 ft (8.8 m) vessel, enduring freezing temperatures, rain, snow, and waves up to 30 ft (9.1 m) in height. The rowers worked in 90-minute shifts for 24 hours a day, travelling 665 mi (1,070 km). The trip was documented in real-time by the Discovery Channel in a multi-platform series documentary called The Impossible Row.

After completion of the Drake Passage, Bellamy planned to complete the longest unassisted swim at 180 km (110 mi), to take place across Issyk-Kul Lake in Kyrgyzstan. The goal was to complete the record set by Sarah Thomas of 168.3 km (104.6 mi) set swimming across Lake Champlain in North America. The feat was put on hold due to the COVID-19 pandemic.
