= Queen of the Channel =

The Queen of the Channel is a title bestowed on the woman who has completed more successful swims of the English Channel than any other. The title as well the accompanied Ray & Audrey Scott Queen of the Channel Trophy is awarded by the Channel Swimming Association. It is held by Chloë McCardel with a total of 44 swims. Chloë McCardel set new Channel records for the greatest number of swims in a week and the most in a season. Kevin Murphy, with 34 swims between the years of 1968 and 2006, has the designation as King of the Channel.

== List of Queen of the Channel ==
Swimmer	Number of crossings	Years title held
(United States) Gertrude Ederle	1	1926-1953
(United States) Florence Chadwick	2-3	1953-1964
(Denmark) Greta Andersen	4-5	1964-1978
(Canada) Cynthia Nicholas	6-19	1978-1992
(United Kingdom) Alison Streeter	20-43	1992-2021
(Australia) Chloë McCardel	43-44	2021-

== See also ==
- List of sports awards honoring women
