= Andrew Towne =

American lawyer

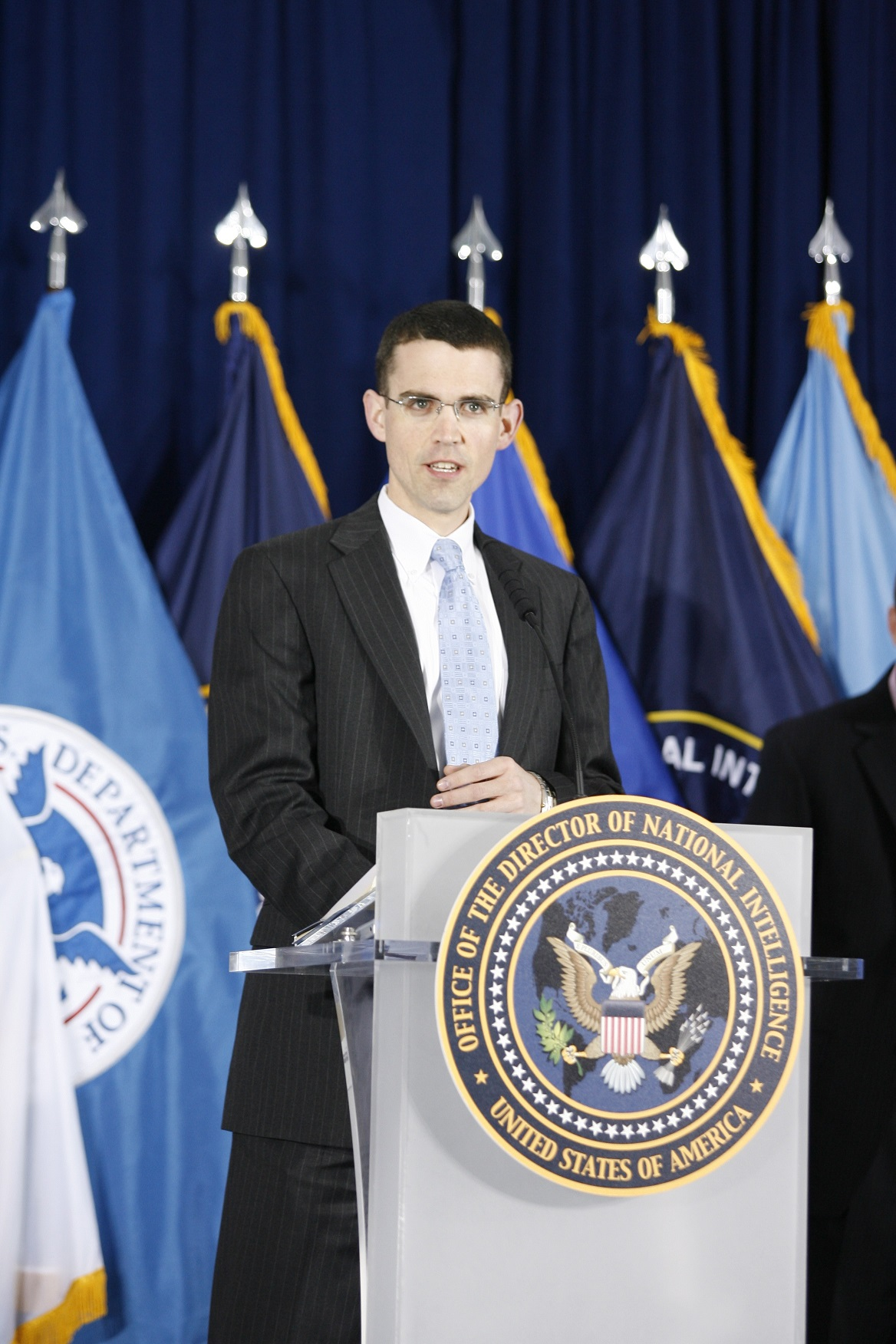
- Andrew Towne speaking at Office of the Director of National Intelligence
- Education: JD/MBA
- Alma mater: Yale University (BA); University of Pennsylvania (JD/MBA)
- Occupations: Adventurer, explorer
- Employer: Boston Consulting Group
- Known for: First row across Drake Passage

Andrew Towne is an American businessman, endurance athlete, adventurer, and motivational speaker. He is known for being part of the six-person rowing crew that completed the first-ever human-powered crossing of the Drake Passage between Cape Horn in South America and Antarctica in December 2019. He is currently a Principal for the Boston Consulting Group's Minneapolis office.

== Early life and education ==
Towne grew up in Grand Forks, North Dakota. His father was a professor of music at the University of North Dakota, and his late mother was an Episcopal priest. He attended Grand Forks Central High School, where he graduated as co-valedictorian in 2000. While in high school, he participated in the Youth For Understanding exchange program, spending a year studying abroad in Germany. He went on to attend Yale University. During his studies at Yale, he also spent a year abroad at the University of Nairobi in Kenya and won the Intercollegiate Rowing Association national championship regatta as the four-seat on the Yale varsity lightweight crew. He graduated with honors with a degree in political science.

He attended the Wharton School and the University of Pennsylvania Law School, earning a JD/MBA in a joint program in 2015. Towne was also a member of the University of Pennsylvania Running Club that won the National Intercollegiate Running Club Association national championship in the half marathon in 2013.

== Career ==
After completing his undergraduate degree at Yale, Towne joined the United States Intelligence Community, serving as an analyst for the Central Intelligence Agency. He also worked for the Office of the Director of National Intelligence and served as an analyst in Iraq during the Iraq War. In 2015, he took a position as a management consultant for the Boston Consulting Group's Minneapolis office, where he remains employed. Towne is the board chair of Youth For Understanding USA and licensed to practice law in the state of Minnesota.

== Expeditions ==
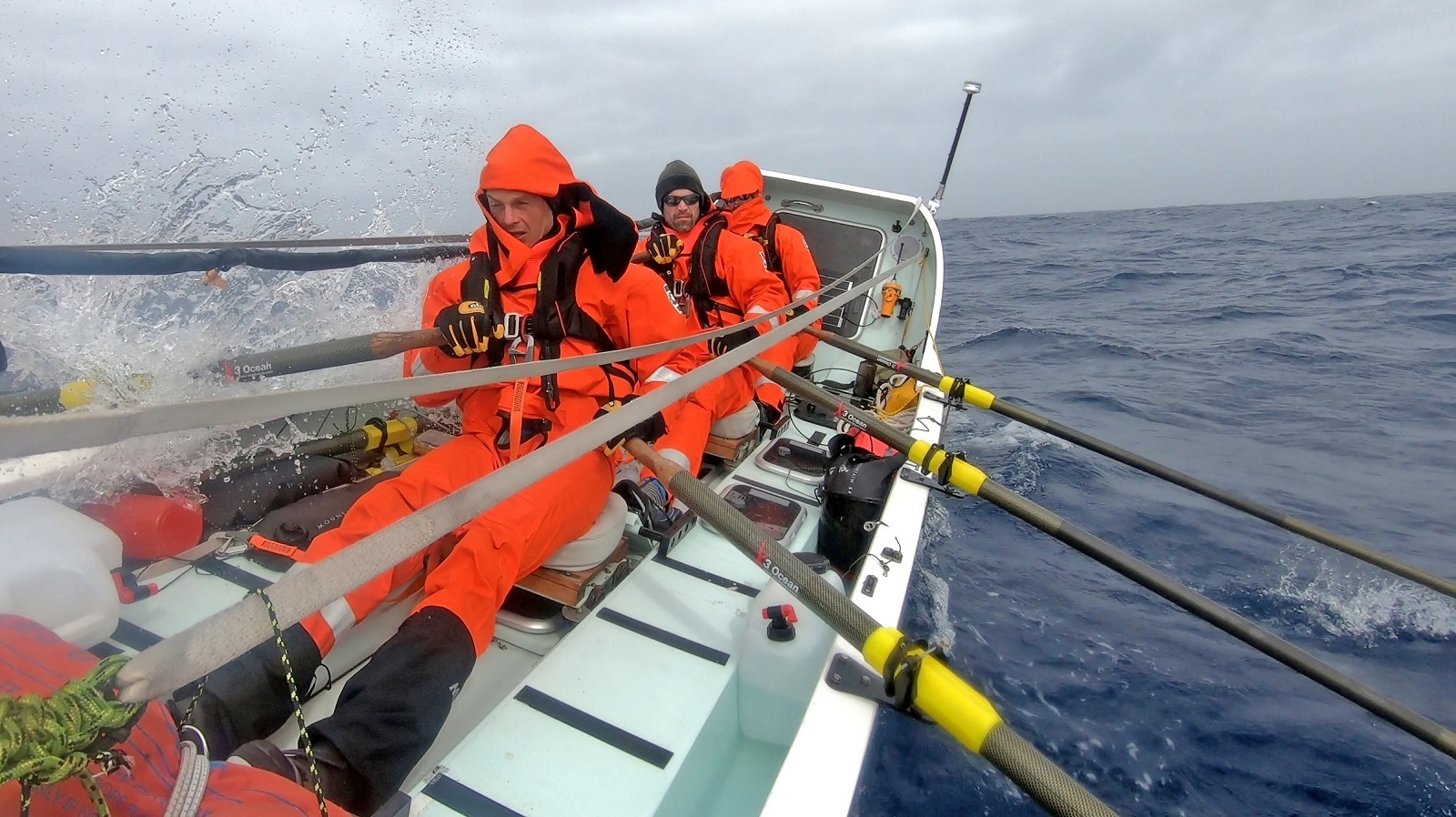
Adventurers Fiann Paul (front), Andrew Towne (middle), and John Peterson (rear) during "The Impossible Row" in 2019.

While studying abroad in Kenya in 2003, Towne climbed Mount Kilimanjaro, the highest peak in Africa. He would later scale each of the remaining Seven Summits (the highest mountains on each continent) in the following 14 years. In 2011, he climbed Aconcagua in South America and the Carstensz Pyramid in Oceania. The following year, he reached the peaks of Denali in North America and Mount Elbrus in Europe. In 2015, he completed Vinson Massif in Antarctica. That year, he also made his first attempt to climb Mount Everest, but was forced to suspend the trip after surviving the 2015 Mount Everest avalanches caused by the 7.8-magnitude Gorkha earthquake. He also assisted in the treatment of injured climbers after the avalanche. Towne ultimately completed the Seven Summits in 2017 after reaching the top of Mount Everest on his second attempt.

In 2017, Towne was introduced to Icelandic ocean rower Fiann Paul, who discussed the idea of rowing the Drake Passage from the southern tip of South America (Cape Horn) to Antarctica. Paul recruited South African athlete Cameron Bellamy and Scottish rower Jamie Douglas-Hamilton. The three had previously set world records for rowing across the Indian Ocean in 2014. Towne recruited two fellow Yale alumni: swimmer and endurance athlete Colin O'Brady and former Yale rowing captain John Petersen.

Between December 13 and 25, 2019, the six men rowed across the Drake Passage in a 29-foot vessel, enduring freezing temperatures, rain, snow, and waves up to 30 feet in height. The rowers worked in 90-minute shifts for 24 hours a day, traveling 665 land miles. The expedition achieved nine different world records, according to Guinness World Records. The trip was documented in real-time by the Discovery Channel in a multi-platform series documentary called The Impossible Row.

== World records ==
- First row on the Southern Ocean
- First row across the Drake Passage
- First row to the Antarctic continent
- Southernmost start of a rowing expedition
- Southernmost latitude reached by a rowing vessel
