= Vural =

Vural is a Turkish masculine name and a surname. Notable people with the name are as follows:

== Given name ==
- Ragıp Vural Tandoğan (born 1965), Turkish long-distance swimmer
- Vural Arıkan (1929–1993), Turkish economist, lawyer and politician
- Vural Balcan, Turkish Olympic fencer
- Vural Öger (born 1942), German politician

== Surname ==
- Esra Vural (born 1983), German voice actress
- Filiz Vural (born 1953), Turkish beauty contestant
- İhsan Emre Vural (born 1984), Turkish rower
- İsak Vural (born 2006), Turkish football player
- Yılmaz Vural (born 1953), Turkish football coach
