= Des Renford =

Australian swimmer

Personal information
- Born: 25 August 1927 Sydney, Australia
- Died: 30 December 1999 (aged 72)

Sport
- Sport: Swimming

Desmond Robert Renford MBE (25 August 1927 – 30 December 1999) was an Australian long-distance swimmer who swam the English Channel 19 times from 19 attempts. This was a record for successful crossings by an Australian until it was overtaken by Chloe McCardel in 2016. From 1975 to 1979 and for a period in 1980 he held the title of King of the Channel. At the time of his death, only two other people had swum the Channel more often, Alison Streeter and Michael Read.

== Biography ==
Des Renford was born on the 52nd anniversary of the very first Channel swim, achieved in 1875 by Matthew Webb. He took up marathon swimming only at the age of 39. His Channel crossings included three in 10 days in 1980. In 1977 he broke the record for swimming around Alcatraz Island by 23 minutes.

He was a mentor of Susie Maroney, and led her on her first Channel crossing when she was 15.

In the Queen's Birthday Honours of 12 June 1976, Renford was appointed a Member of the Order of the British Empire (MBE).

He was a Papal knight of the Order of the Holy Sepulchre (the letters OHS sometimes appear after his name). He was inducted into the Sport Australia Hall of Fame in 1998.

He suffered three heart attacks and a stroke, and had undergone heart surgery. He had a fourth heart attack while swimming on 29 December 1999. He went into a coma, was admitted to the Prince of Wales Hospital in Sydney, and died there the following evening. His wife Patie, whom he married in 1945, and their three sons were at his bedside when he died.

The former Heffron Park Pool was renamed in Des Renford's honour on 1 March 2000 as the Des Renford Leisure Centre.
