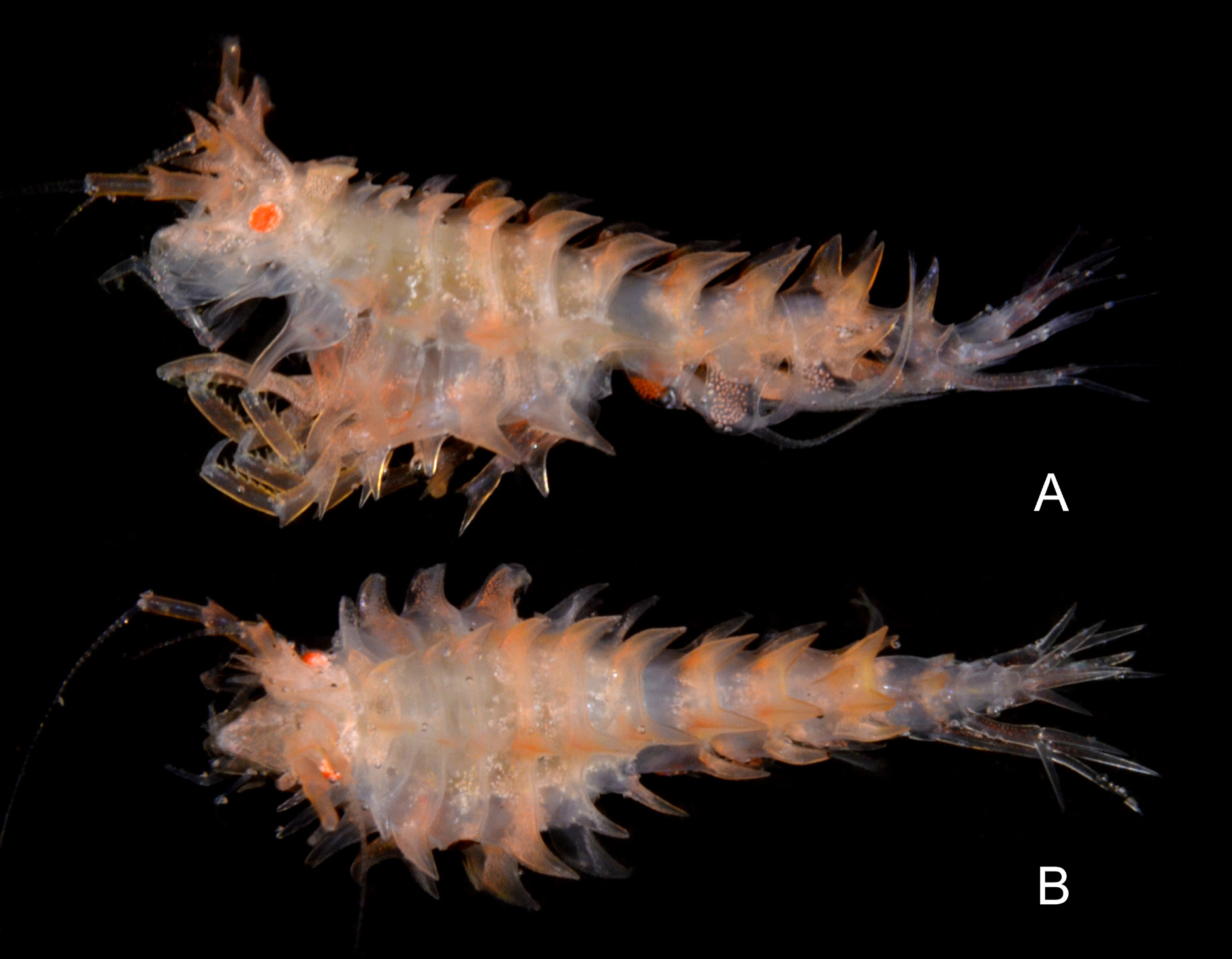
- Acanthonotozomoides oatesi is in the family Acanthonotozomellidae

Scientific classification
- Kingdom: Animalia
- Phylum: Arthropoda
- Clade: Pancrustacea
- Class: Malacostraca
- Order: Amphipoda
- Parvorder: Amphilochidira
- Superfamily: Iphimedioidea
- Family: Acanthonotozomellidae; Coleman & Barnard, 1991

= Acanthonotozomellidae =

Family of crustaceans

Acanthonotozomellidae is a family of amphipod crustaceans. A new species was discovered deep in Drake Passage in 2001, with small teeth covering its body. As of 2022, four genera and eight species are currently recognized.

== Genera ==
- Acanthonotozomella
- Acanthonotozomoides
- Actinacanthus
- Amatiguakius
