= Ocean Explorers Grand Slam =

Human-powered vessel adventurer goal

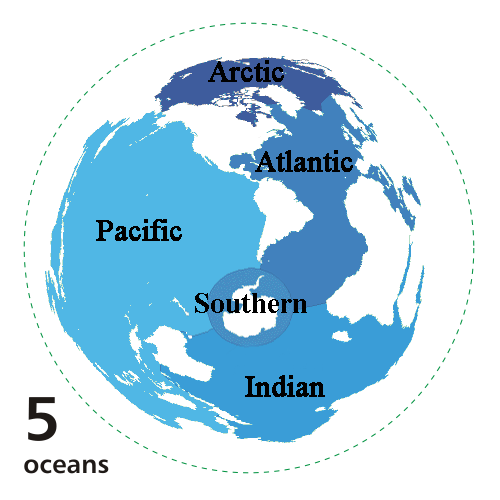
Ocean boundaries following the 5 oceans model.

The Ocean Explorers Grand Slam is an adventure goal to complete open-water crossings on all five oceans using human-powered vessels.

== History ==
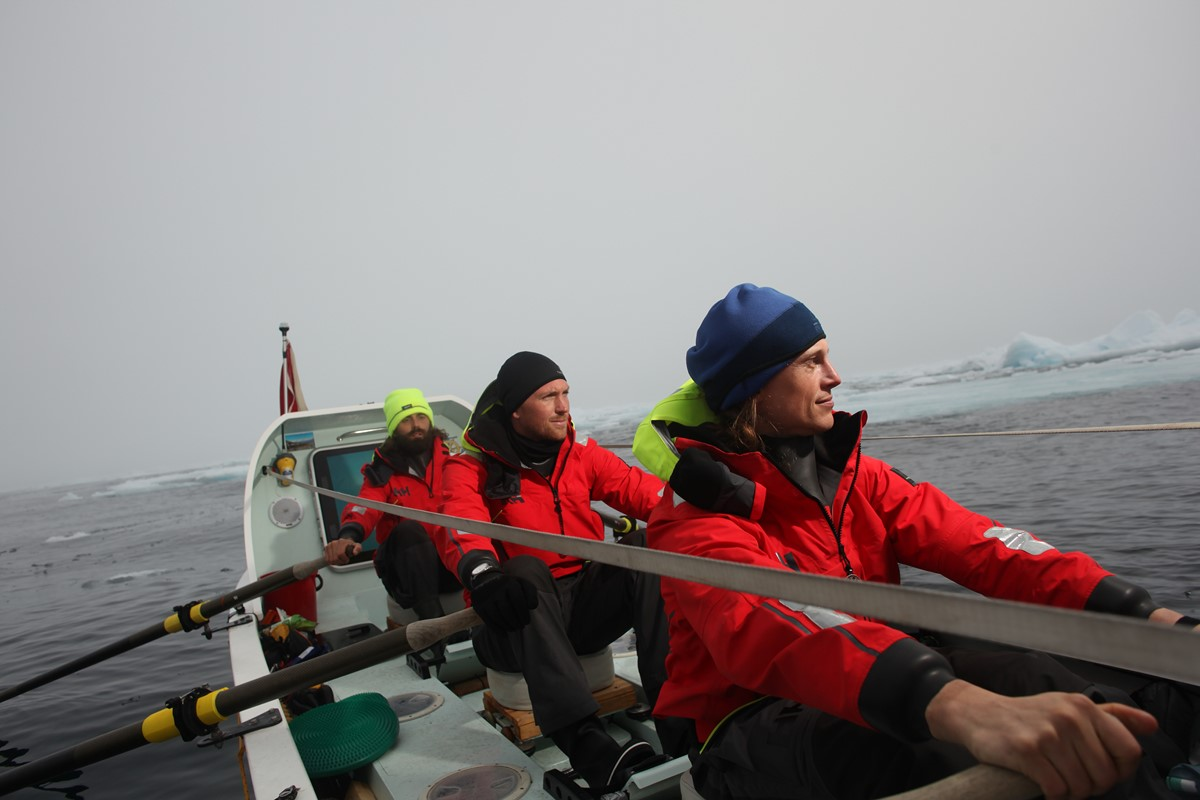
Fiann Paul, Alex Gregory, Carlo Facchino, Arctic Ocean Rowing

In 2019, Icelandic explorer Fiann Paul led the first human-powered transit (by rowing) across the Drake Passage (The Impossible Row) and, in doing so, he completed the row on his fifth ocean, and became the first person to achieve the Ocean Explorers Grand Slam. The Ocean Explorers Grand Slam was defined by Guinness World Records adjudicators as completing open-water crossings on all five oceans using human-powered vessels. Fiann achieved the title with his completed crossings on the following oceans: Atlantic (date of completion: 2011), Indian (2014), Pacific (2016), Arctic (2017), and Southern (2019). Completion of this quest took him 9 years.

The definition "Rows on the Polar Open Waters" applies only to pure rowing expeditions across major water basins above the Polar Circle in the Arctic or within the actual boundaries of the Southern Ocean, from land to land, excluding any use of sail, paddling on kayaks or canoes, as well as rows around islands, within archipelagos and coastal rows, i.e. within vicinity of land and possibility to get ashore.

The definition "Ocean Crossing on the Polar Open Waters" applies to pure human-powered expeditions across major water basins above the Polar Circle in the Arctic or within the actual boundaries of the Southern Ocean, from land to land, excluding any use of sail as well as the expeditions around islands, within archipelagos and coastal routes, i.e. within vicinity of land and possibility to get ashore.

== People who completed the quest ==
1. (Iceland) Fiann Paul

== See also ==
- Explorers Grand Slam
- Five Deeps Expedition
- Grand Slam (golf)
- Grand Slam (tennis)
