= Michael Read =

English long-distance swimmer

Personal information
- Born: June 9, 1941 (age 85) Brighton, Great Britain

Sport
- Sport: Swimming
- Strokes: Long-distance swimming

Michael Peter Read MBE (born 9 June 1941) is an English long-distance swimmer who has the fourth most crossings of the English Channel – 33 to date. The current Queen of the Channel is Chloë McCardel with 44 crossings.

== Competitive swimming ==
Born in Brighton, Read began swimming relatively late at 14 years old. He joined Brighton Swimming Club in 1955 and became its youngest committee member in 1957. During the period from 1969 to 1971 he became a FINA judge, timekeeper, referee and starter and he remembers his time at the Edinburgh Commonwealth pool with great affection. English Schools champion, British Universities Champion, and second in the ASA National Championships in 1959, Read was selected to represent Great Britain in Swimming in the 1960 Olympic Games in Rome but unfortunately due to injury, was never able to compete.

He joined the Channel Swimming Association (CSA) in 1969, making his first crossing that year and became a committee member in 1973. He was elected Vice Chairman from 1977 to 1993 and Chairman of the CSA from 1993 to 1999. He joined the Board of Directors of the newly constituted CSA in 1999 and was elected Chairman. After a long struggle with the former King, Des Renford, he finally became King of the Channel in 1979 and took the record number of crossings from 17 to 31, with Des snatching back the 18th. Read retired from Channel swimming in 1984. Most of his training took place at the Ipswich lido: Broomhill, which was closed for many years but reopening is planned for 2020.

Read briefly lost the title in 2000, having held it for 21 years, but regained the title in 2004 with his 33rd crossing. He is the only swimmer ever to have been awarded the title and the Letona Trophy 3 times. He has had a distinguished long-distance swimming career, competing in more than 120 swims over distances now termed "ultra marathon" swims and many more of the new battle of marathon distance.

== Later years ==
Read was a nutritionist, and lived in Hethersett, moving from Edinburgh in September 1972.

Unusually for an administrator he has continued to compete over a period of six decades, and still competes internationally in competitions up to 30 km. In his youth he competed in over 225 BLDSA events, won many BLDSA championships across the UK including the 1970 Windermere International, the Loch Ness Championship, set over 70 records and was the BLDSA Double Windermere Championship for nine consecutive years.

In recent years he has also competed in the World, European and National Masters competitions. He has been the ASA National Masters 3 km champion on more than 10 occasions and runner-up four times. On one occasion when the event was held in Ullswater, he was second in the ASA 25 km; only two swimmers finished but he was judged out of time. He made a number of inaugural swims in the Scottish Lochs and the first ever two-way crossing of the Wash from Skegness to Hunstanton and back to Skegness. Among other firsts were the first ever three-way swim of Windermere and the first four-way swim. He was the first person to swim Loch Tay, Loch Rannoch, from Perth to Broughty Ferry and the 65 km from Mora to Amposta in the Ebro river. He was the second person to swim around the Isle of Wight.

== Honours ==
Read was inducted into the International Marathon Swimming Hall of Fame in 1978 and has been made an Honorary citizen of both Nikiti in Greece and Dervio in Italy. In February 2009 he was awarded the International Swimming Hall of Fame Davids/Wheeler Memorial Award which recognises contributors to the administration of open water swimming worldwide.

Read was appointed Member of the Order of the British Empire (MBE) in the 2012 New Year Honours for services to swimming.

== Records held ==
- First person to complete a 3 way swim of Windermere (30.75 miles) on 20 July 1972.
- First person to complete a 4 way swim of Windermere (41 miles) on 20 July 1972.
- First person to swim Loch Tay (14 miles) in August 1973.
- First person to swim Loch Lomond (21.6 miles) twice.
- Most English Channel Swims in a Year by a man - 6 in 1979. (Alison Streeter holds the out right record with 7 in 1992).
- Latest channel crossing on 28 October 1979
