= Losing Sight of Shore =

2017 documentary film by Sarah Moshman

- Directed by: Sarah Moshman
- Written by: Sarah Moshman; Peter Saroufim
- Release date: 23 April 2017
- Running time: 92 minutes

Losing Sight of Shore is a 2017 documentary film, directed by Sarah Moshman, which chronicles the journey of four British women, nicknamed "The Coxless Crew", who row across the Pacific Ocean from California to Australia without the support of trailing boats.

== Journey ==
The journey took 9 months and covered 8,446 miles (13,593 km), with stops in Hawaii and Samoa. The crew launched their boat from San Francisco, California and ended their journey in Cairns, Australia. The crew rowed two-at-a-time, for two hours on, followed by two hours off. With several days to go, they ran out of food. Psychological stress, including fear and isolation, was a major challenge faced by each of the crew members.

== Cast ==
Laura Penhaul, Natalia Cohen, Emma Mitchell completed all 3 legs. Isabel Burnham, Lizanne Van Vuuren, and Meg Dyos rowed the first, second and third legs, respectively. They referred to themselves as the "Coxless Crew", a double entendre partly in reference to the absence of a coxswain in their crew.

== Film ==
The film was made using a combination of GoPro footage of at-sea activity, and professional film crew for on- and near-shore footage.

== See also ==
- The Impossible Row – 2020 documentary on a crew rowing across the Drake Passage
