= King of the Channel (swimming) =

The King of The Channel title is bestowed on the man who has successfully completed more swims of the English Channel than any other. The title as well the accompanied Letona Trophy is awarded by the Channel Swimming Association. The title is currently held by Kevin Murphy who has completed 34 swims between the years of 1968 and 2006. Chloë McCardel, with 44 crossings, has the designation as Queen of the Channel.

== List of Kings of the Channel ==
Swimmer	Number of Crossings	Years Held Title
(United Kingdom) Matthew Webb	1	1875-1934
(United Kingdom) Edward Temme	2	1934-1951
(United Kingdom) William Barnie	3	1951-1960
(Bangladesh) Brojen Das	4-6	1960-1974
(United Kingdom) Melvyn Sharp	7	1974-1975
(Australia) Desmond Renford	8-16	1975-1979
(United Kingdom) Michael Read	17-18	1979-1980
(Australia) Desmond Renford	19	1980
(United Kingdom) Michael Read	20-31	1980-2000
(United Kingdom) Kevin Murphy	32	2000-2004
(United Kingdom) Michael Read	33	2004-2006
(United Kingdom) Kevin Murphy	34	2006-
