= Tandoğan =

Tandoğan is a Turkish surname. Notable people with the surname include:

- Ali Tandoğan (born 1977), Turkish footballer
- Aslı Tandoğan (born 1979), Turkish actress
- Nevzat Tandoğan (1894–1946), Turkish politician
- Ragıp Vural Tandoğan (born 1965), Turkish long-distance swimmer
