= The Impossible Row =

2020 documentary film

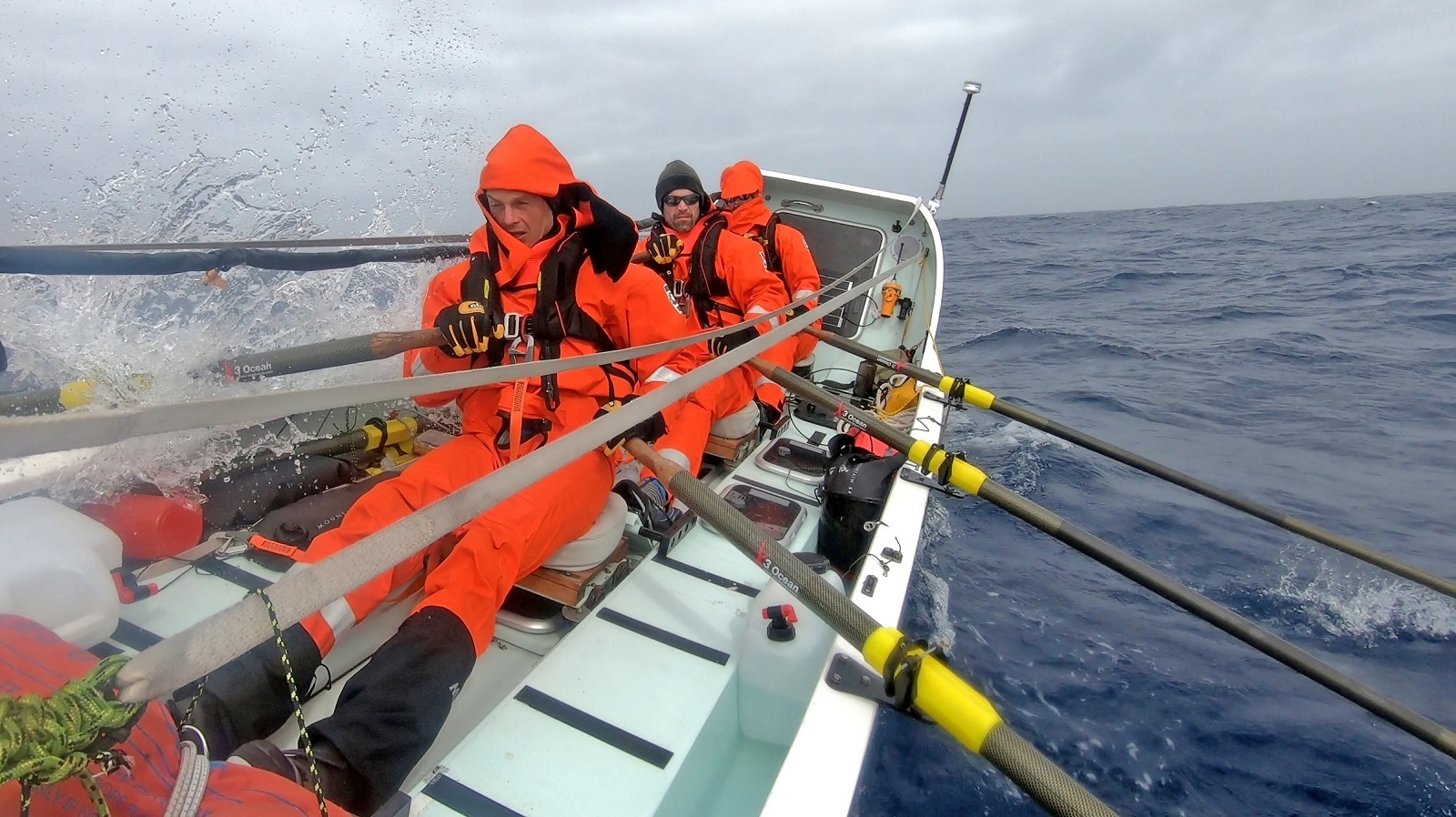
- Captain Fiann Paul, Andrew Towne, and John Petersen
- Starring: Fiann Paul; Colin O'Brady; Andrew Towne; Cameron Bellamy; John Petersen; Jamie Douglas-Hamilton
- Original language: English

Production
- Producer: Matador Content

Original release
- Release: 2020

The Impossible Row is a documentary from the Discovery Channel. It follows explorers as they row across the Drake Passage and become the first in history to do so. The journey took 12 days and ended on December 25, 2019 with the six crew members reaching Antarctica. They were the first to accomplish three feats, including the first to row across the Drake Passage, the first to row to the Antarctic, and the first to row in the Southern Ocean.

The six crew members were Fiann Paul, Colin O'Brady, Andrew Towne, Cameron Bellamy, John Petersen, and Jamie Douglas-Hamilton. The documentary follows the crew members on their journey between South America and Antarctica. It was released in early 2020 on the Discovery Channel and also in a video series on DiscoveryGo. It was also nominated for a Critics' Choice Real TV Award in 2020.

== See also ==
- Losing Sight of Shore – 2017 documentary on four women rowing across the Pacific
