= Adam Burke =

Adam Burke may refer to:

- Adam Burke (rower), Irish ocean rower
- Adam Burke (comedian) (born 1976), American stand-up comedian, writer, and comic artist
- Adam Burke (animator) (1971–2018), American animator of Toy Story 4
