= Louis Rudd =

Louis Rudd MBE
- Born: UK
- Occupations: Explorer, Adventurer, Author, Soldier
- Known for: First Briton and second person overall to ski solo across Antarctica
- Website: lourudd.com

Louis Rudd is an explorer and former captain in the British Army. He is the first Briton and second person overall to ski solo across Antarctica. He completed the feat in 2018, finishing two days behind Colin O'Brady.

Rudd was a UK Army Reservist at the time he successfully journeyed to the South Pole in 2011. He joined the Royal Marines at the age of 16 and served tours in both Iraq and Afghanistan. He also led a team of Army reservists across Antarctica, a trip that took 67 days to complete.

Rudd has three children and resides in Hereford.
