= Susie Maroney =

Australian distance swimmer

Personal information
- Full name: Susan Jean Maroney
- Born: 15 November 1974 (age 52) Cronulla, New South Wales, Australia
- Height: 1.68 m (5 ft 6 in) (2009)

Sport
- Sport: Swimming

Susan Jean Maroney OAM (born 15 November 1974) is an Australian former marathon swimmer.

In 1997, aged 22, Maroney was the first woman and second person to swim the 180 km (110 mi) Florida Straits from Cuba to the United States with a shark cage. In 1998 she swam a record 197 km (122 mi) from Mexico to Cuba, covering the longest distance at the time swum without flippers in open sea.

== Early life ==
Susan Jean Maroney was born on 15 November 1974. She was born with cerebral palsy, which she kept secret until 2007, when she and her mother Pauline revealed it on the TV talk show Enough Rope.

She is the daughter of Norm Maroney, former Assistant Commissioner of New South Wales Police. She had a twin brother Sean, also a triathlete, who died in 2002 after falling from a balcony in Honolulu. Her brother Michael (Mick) is a former police officer and a junior triathlon champion. He was an unsuccessful Labor Party candidate in Holsworthy at the 2023 New South Wales state election.

She was four years old when she started swimming, and by the time she was seven years old she was competing in swimming carnivals. Before that she only competed in short-distance events. After turning 13, she came to realise that she could do long swims, and after failing to graduate from high school she pursued her vocation.

== Swimming career ==
She was recognised as a long-distance swimmer in 1989 when she achieved third place in the Australian Marathon Swimming Championship for Women, aged 14. In 1990 she became the first person to swim from Manly, New South Wales to Darling Harbour and back again in seven hours. That same year she also broke the speed record for swimming the English Channel, with the help of her mentor Des Renford.

In 1999, Maroney was admitted to hospital after having a severe asthma attack following a 675-lap swim for charity. Shortly after that she was arrested for driving under the influence, and although the charge was upheld, no conviction was recorded. She later admitted she had had a mental breakdown at that time, and was treated for exhaustion.

She retired from swimming on 23 February 2003, officially ending her career by swimming from the Sydney Opera House to Manly.

== Honours and awards ==
In 1989, 1990 and 1991, Maroney was awarded the Advance Australia Award. In 1991 she was awarded the Channel 10 Young Achievers Sport Award and in 1993 the Order of Australia Medal. She also received the Outstanding Achievement Award from the New South Wales Government in 1997; the same year she was inducted into the International Hall of Fame for her accomplishments. In 1996 she was awarded the Victorian Young Achiever of the Year, by the Asthma Foundation.

In 2005 Maroney was inducted to the International Marathon Swimming Hall Of Fame as an Honor Swimmer. In 2020 Maroney was inducted to the Australian Marathon Swimming Hall Of Fame, as an Honoree.

== Achievements ==
- Three time winner of the Manhattan Island swim race in years 1991, 1992 and 1994.
- Fastest female two way English Channel Crossing (England/France/England) in 1991 at age 17 in time of 17 h 14 min.
- At age 22, the first female and second person to swim the 180 km (110 mi) Florida Straits from Cuba to the United States with a shark cage (12 May 1997).
- Swam a record 197 km (122 mi) from Mexico to Cuba, covering the longest distance at the time swum without flippers in open sea, in 38 hours and 33 minutes (1 June 1998). The longest distance ever swum without flippers in open sea is 225 km (140 mi) by Croatian Veljko Rogosic across the Adriatic Sea from Grado to Riccione (both Italy) from 29 to 31 August 2006. The attempt took her 50 hours 10 mins. The distance was determined by GPS.
- Completed 160 km (99 mi) swim from Jamaica to Cuba (15 September 1999). During Hurricane Floyd, a category 4 hurricane.

== Other activities ==
In 2019, Maroney competed in the sixth season of Australian Survivor. She was eliminated on Day 7 and finished in 22nd place.

== Personal life ==
Maroney gave birth to a daughter in 2008. The baby's father, Maroney's estranged husband Robert Daniels, engaged a solicitor to legally challenge her name because she did not give the baby his surname.

Maroney later married Darren May, a furniture maker, and gave birth to a daughter in 2010. Maroney and May separated when Maroney was pregnant with their second child.

In November 2016, she married Perry Cross, a former rugby union footballer and a quadriplegic since the age of 19, after an injury caused by a tackle during a Queensland Rugby Union trial. They separated after about a year.

On 22 February 2016, it was revealed in New Idea magazine that Maroney had been diagnosed with melanoma.
