= Mervyn Sharp =

English swimmer

Personal information
- Born: c. 1949 Weymouth, Dorset, Great Britain

Sport
- Sport: Swimming

Mervyn Sharp is a long-distance swimmer from Weymouth, Dorset. His first crossing of the English Channel was in 1967 from France-England, he did it in eight hours and thirty four minutes. He then swam the channel from England-France in 1968, 1969, 1970, 1973 and 1974. He held the 'King of the channel' title from 1974 to 1975, it was then broken by Des Renford. He was a member of Weymouth swimming club in Weymouth.
