= Adam Burke (rower) =

Irish ocean rower

Personal information
- Nationality: Republic of Ireland
- Born: 1985 or 1986 (age 39–40)

Adam Burke is an ocean rower from Skerries, County Dublin, Ireland. He currently holds two Guinness World Records; firstly as a crew member on the Sara G, the fastest pure class ocean rowing boat to have crossed the Atlantic Ocean east to west, and secondly, as a member of the same crew that rowed the most consecutive days, achieving a distance of over 100 miles per day. The record now stands at 12 days.
