= Jamie Douglas-Hamilton =

Adventurer

Jamie Douglas-Hamilton is an adventurer who is a world record holder for being part of the team completing the first man-powered crossing of Drake Passage, a feat that was made into the 2020 documentary The Impossible Row.

== Career ==
In 2014, Douglas-Hamilton was part of a team that rowed from Australia to Africa, crossing the Indian Ocean. The row broke two world records, one for the fastest crossing of the Indian Ocean and one for the longest crossing.

In December 2019, Douglas-Hamilton was part of the six-man team on the first man-powered crossing of Drake Passage, the body of water between South America and Antarctica. It took 13 days and 700+ miles in a boat that was 29 feet long. He was featured in the 2020 documentary The Impossible Row for his participation in the row.

Douglas-Hamilton was part of a team that attempted to row from Elephant Island to South Georgia in 2022. The row was ended early due to frostbite concerns, but achieved eight world records, including the longest distance rowed on the Southern Ocean.

== Personal life ==
Douglas Hamilton is the son of Lord Selkirk of Douglas and the grandson of Douglas Douglas-Hamilton
