= Aysu Türkoğlu =

Turkish open water swimmer (born 2001)

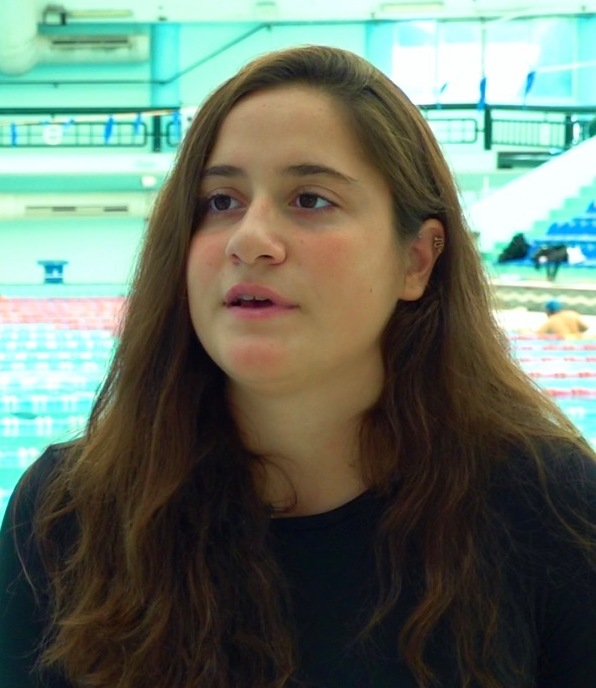
- Türkoğlu in 2023

Personal information
- Born: 2 May 2001 (age 25) Bodrum, Muğla, Turkey

Sport
- Sport: Swimming

Aysu Türkoğlu (born 2 May 2001) is a Turkish swimmer specializing in open water swimming. As of 2024, she has completed three of the Oceans Seven swimming events.

== Early years in swimming ==
Aysu Türkoğlu started swimming at age seven in the Bodrum Swimming Club, inspired by her older sister Aynur, who was a swimmer competing at national level.

In the years between 2015 and 2017, she took part in all four swimming styles of all different distances in the pool. Although successful in her age classes, she thought that "she was not fast enough in sprint swimming in pool", and so she chose open water swimming.

In 2016, while studying in 9th grade, she swam for the first time in an interscholastic long-distance swim competition held at İçmeler, Marmaris, Muğla Province, and became champion in the 6 km event. She performed triathlon for a while in 2018. However, she decided on endurance swimming for the future.

== Open water swimming career ==
She won several titles in the 1.5 km, 3 km and 10 km events at the Marathon Masters Winter Championships and some local open water tournaments between 2017 and 2021.

In the night of 29-30 July 2022, Türkoğlu swam the English Channel, a part of the Oceans Seven series, from England to Cap Gris-Nez, France in a time of 16:28.

As the first Turkish woman and the youngest Turkish swimmer, she completed the 26 mi (42 km)-long North Channel between Ireland and Scotland, an Oceans Seven event, at 11:48.19 on 9 August 2022.

She became champion in the 2 km, 3 km and 5 km events at the International Aquamasters Open Water Swimming Championship in Bodrum in October and in Marmaris in November 2022.

She swam the around 17 mi (27 km)-long Cook Strait in New Zealand, which is another Oceans Seven swim event, in a time of 7:21.40 on 20 March 2024.

== Personal life ==
Aysu Türkoğlu was born to Mustafa Türkoğlu, a retired boat manufacturer, and his spouse Yurdakul, a municipality employee, in Bodrum district of Muğla Province, southwestern Turkey on 2 May 2001. She has an older sister Aynur, also a swimmer.

Türkoğlu was schooled in Cumhuriyet Primary School. She then attended Merkez Turgutreis Middle School, and Turgutreis Hayırlı Sabancı Anatolian High School. After graduating from Bodrum Fen Bilimleri High School, she went on to study coaching in the Sports Science Faculty of Ege University in İzmir.

== See also ==
- Bengisu Avcı (born 1996), Turkish female swimmer competing in the Oceans Seven,
- Ragıp Vural Tandoğan, Turkish open water swimmer,
- Tuna Tunca (born 2003), Turkish male autistic long-distance swimmer.
