= Bengisu Avcı =

Turkish open water swimmer (born 1996)

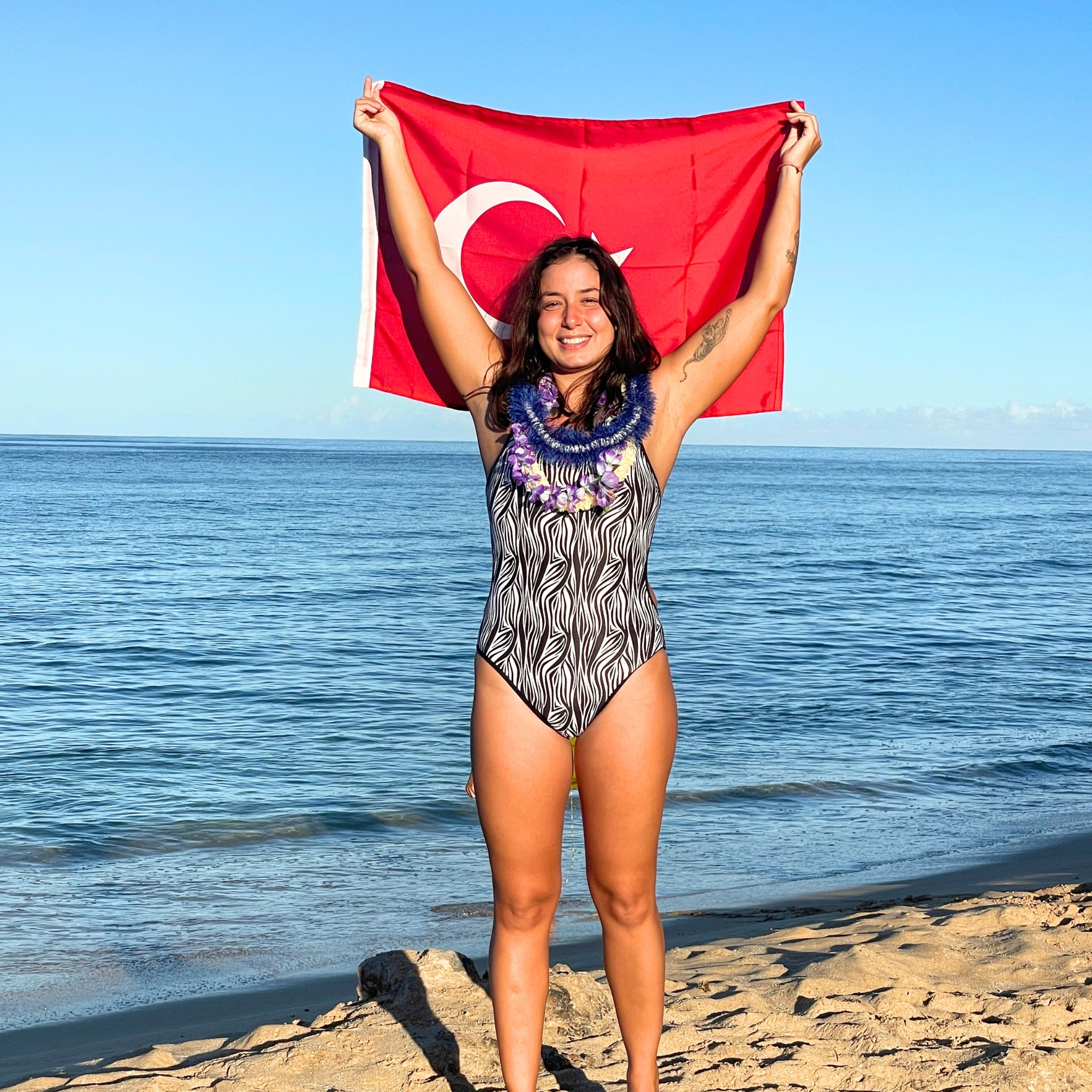
- Bengisu Avcı in May 2024

Personal information
- Nickname: "Daughter of Ocean"
- National team: Turkey (2011–2015)
- Born: May 8, 1996 (age 30) İzmir, Turkey

Sport
- Sport: Swimming
- Club: Ege University Swim Club

Bengisu Avcı (born 1996) is a Turkish swimmer specializing in open water swimming. She is holder of the Triple Crown of Open Water Swimming. As of 4 August 2025, she completed the Oceans Seven challenge, being the first Turkish person to do so.

== Sport career ==
Avcı started her swimming career at age six in the Ege University Swim Club. In 2011, she was admitted to the national team, where she was a member until 2015. She switched over to marathon swimming with the recommendation of her coach in the Ege University Swim Club in 2013. In the beginning, she competed in the 3K and 5K, later in the 7.5K and 10K distances. She works as a swimming coach.

In 2016, she swam within a Turkish group the 34 km (21 mi) distance from Naples to Capri Island in the Tyrrhenian Sea in Italy. In 2017, Avcı attempted to swim the English Channel, which she had to give up after seven hours due to hypothermia in the 16 °C (61 °F) water. On 3 August the next year, she swam the same course of 34 km (21 mi) from England to Cap Gris-Nez, France in a time of 11:29. She became the second Turkish woman and the youngest in Turkey.

On 5-6 September 2022, she took up the Oceans Seven series by swimming the 34 km (21 mi)-long Catalina Channel between Santa Catalina Island and Los Angeles, United States in a time of 11:59 as the first Turkish woman.

The next year, she swam 48.5 km (30.1 mi) around the Manhattan Island, New York, United States, also known as the 20 Bridges Swim. She was awarded the Triple Crown of Open Water Swimming by the World Aquatics. She became the first Turkish woman to receive this title.

On 8 August 2023, in the occasion of the 100th anniversary of the Turkish Republic, she swam the 30 km (19 mi)-long course between the historic ANZAC Cove and the island Gökçeada in the northern Aegean Sea together with Murat Öz in a time of 10:36.

Also in August 2023, she swam the Strait of Gibraltar between Europe and Africa. She completed the fourth swim of the Oceans Seven with the 26 km (16 mi)-long Cook Strait swim between New Zealand’s North and South Islands on 13 February 2024.

For her fifth swim of the Oceans Seven series, she tried to cross the around 45 km (28 mi)-long Kaiwi Channel, also known as the Molokaʻi Channel, between the islands Oahu and Molokai in Hawaii, United States. On 13 May 2024, she started from Molokai Island in the evening hours, and swam through the night. Twelve hours into the swim, in the last hours before the finish, she repeatedly came into contact with jellyfish and pieces of moss. She initially ignored the burning from the contact, however, after it intensified, possibly as the result of a contact with a man o' war, a jellyfish-like siphonophore or with a box jellyfish, she had to give up and get onto the escorting boat. It was reported that her health was in good condition.

On 20 July 2025, Avcı crossed the 26 mi (42 km)-long North Channel between Ireland and Great Britain as her sixth event of the Oceans Seven series. She entered the ocean in Bangor, Ireland and swam towards Great Britain completing the event in 10 hours and 48 seconds, which became a national record. She swam more than 62 strokes a minute, surpassing her own standard. Another swimmer, Aysu Türkoğlu, had accomplished the North Channel swim as the first woman from Turkey at 11:48.19 on 9 August 2022.

On 4 August 2025, Avcı crossed the 19.5 km (12.1 mi)-long Tsugaru Strait between the Japanese islands Honshu and Hokkaido in 14 hours. With this feat, she completed the Oceans Seven swim series, becoming the first Turk to finish the series.

Avcı is nicknamed "Okyanus Kızı" ("Daughter of Ocean").

== Personal life ==
Avcı was born to Hüseyin and Meserret Avcı in İzmir in 1996. She studied sports coaching in the Sports Science Faculty of Ege University in İzmir.

== See also ==
- Ragıp Vural Tandoğan (born 1965), Turkish open water swimmer,
- Aysu Türkoğlu (born 2001), Turkish female swimmer competing in the Oceans Seven,
- Tuna Tunca (born 2003), Turkish male autistic long-distance swimmer.
