= Tuna Tunca =

Turkish autistic long-distance swimmer (born 2003)

Personal information
- Born: 2003 (age 22–23) İzmir, Turkey

Sport
- Sport: Swimming
- Club: İzmir Büyükşehir Belediyesi GSK

Tuna Tunca (born 2003) is a Turkish long-distance swimmer. He was the first autistic swimmer from Turkey to cross the English Channel and the Strait of Gibraltar. As of July 2026, he completed three legs of the Oceans Seven challenge.

== Personal life ==
Tunca was born as his parents' only child in İzmir, Turkey in 2003. His mother Gül Nur Tunca (born 1970), an English teacher and later a student adviser, learned that her 2.5-year-old son had autism spectrum disorder (ASD). Realizing that he loved water, his mother encouraged him to swim and took care of everything from his education to his sports.

== Sport career ==
Tunca started his swimming career at age three in his hometown. He is a member of İzmir Büyükşehir Belediyesi GSK.

In 2018, he competed at the Dardanelles Swim, an open water swimming event, and became the runner-up in the disabled swimmer category. He then took part three times at the Bosphorus Cross Continental Swim, and swam from the Greek island Chios to Çesme, in mainland Turkey. He was on the podium in his age category over the 5-kilometer distance in the Bodrum-Marmaris-Göcek Swim.

Participating in the 2021 World Championship in Egypt, Tunca finished fourth in the 10-kilometer swim. He won the Best Doubles Cup with his coach Mert Onaran in the 36 km (22 mi)-long Capri-Naples Swim of the Ultra Marathon Swim Series.

On 13 June 2025, he swam the 34 km (21 mi)-long English Channel between Samphire Hoe, England and Wissant, France in 13 hours and 26 minutes.

He crossed the Strait of Gibraltar on 4 September 2025, entering the sea in Punta Marroqui at 9:27 in Spain, and after 5 hours and 32 minutes, he reached the Maroccan coast in Ziri. Rohan Crouse from England, Ariadna Moreno and Victor Gregori Barrera from Spain accompanied him during the swim.

On 25 July 2026, he crossed the around 40 km (25 mi)-long North Channel between Ireland and Great Britain as his third event of the Oceans Seven series. He entered the 14 °C-cold ocean in Donaghadee, Northern Ireland and swam towards Portpatrick, Scotland completing the swim in 16 hours. He was escorted by his coach Mert Onaran and his mother Gül Nur Tunca.

Donaghadee

== See also ==
- Bengisu Avcı (born 1996), Turkish female long-distance seimmer,
- Aysu Türkoğlu (born 2001), Turkish female long-distance swimmer,
- Ragıp Vural Tandoğan (born 1965), Turkish male long-distance swimmer.
