= Francisco de Hoces =

Spanish sailor

- Born: Unknown
- Died: 1526; Pacific Ocean
- Occupations: Sailor, explorer

Francisco de Hoces (died 1526) was a Spanish sailor who in 1525 joined the Loaísa Expedition to the Spice Islands as commander of the vessel San Lesmes.

In January 1526, the San Lesmes was blown by a gale southwards from the eastern mouth of the Strait of Magellan to 56º S latitude. The crew supposedly had seen an open water connection between Atlantic and Pacific Oceans south of Tierra del Fuego.

== Disappearance and aftermath ==
After the Loaisa Expedition reached the Pacific through the Strait of Magellan, the whole fleet was dispersed by another gale, and the San Lesmes was seen for the last time in late May 1526. The final fate of San Lesmes has been the subject of much speculation, based in some 16th-century European traces later found in different places around the South Pacific.

== See also ==
- List of Antarctic expeditions
- List of people who disappeared mysteriously at sea

== Bibliography ==
- ANALES DE DERECHO. Universidad de Murcia. Número 21. 2003. Págs.217–237
- Landín Carrasco, Amancio. España en el mar. Padrón de descubridores. Madrid: Editorial Naval ISBN 84-7341-078-5
- Oyarzun, Javier. Expediciones españolas al Estrecho de Magallanes y Tierra de Fuego. Madrid: Ediciones Cultura Hispánica ISBN 84-7232-130-4.
- Langdon, Robert. The lost caravel re-explored. Canberra: Brolga Press ISBN 0-9588309-1-6
