= Sara G =

The Sara G is an ocean rowing boat which holds multiple world records.

== Build and specifications ==
She was built in Australia in 2007 and is 11.1 m (36 ft) long and 1.8 m (5.9 ft) wide. There are 3 rowing positions on deck with two cabins: one at the bow and a larger cabin at the stern. The hull is made of Duflex, a composite material with a balsa wood core sandwiched between fiberglass sheeting. She has one sister boat called the 'Vopak Victory'. She was most recently owned by Matt Craughwell and had been docked in Christchurch, England.

== Oceans crossed and records ==
On the 30 December 2007 the Sara G crossed the Tasman Sea by oar, setting a new record of 32 days. In 2010 she crossed the mid-Atlantic Ocean, traveling from Morocco to Barbados in 57 days. On the same route in 2011, the Sara G broke the world record for the fastest rowing crossing of any ocean. The record for the row is 33 days 21 hours and 46 minutes with an average speed of 3.9 knots.

== Accident in 2012 ==
Sara G capsized during an Atlantic Ocean world record attempt in 2012. The capsize could not be righted and the crew of six were forced to abandon the vessel for a life raft. They were rescued after 14 hours adrift by a Taiwanese cargo ship. The crew had completed 2,500 miles of the 3,000 mile route from Morocco to Barbados when the incident occurred on the 28th day of the expedition. The inverted Sara G eventually washed ashore a year later on the Florida Keys, too badly damaged to be repaired. The boat is now on display at the Shipwreck Bar and Grill, a restaurant owned by the salvager in the Key Largo area.
