= Ragıp Vural Tandoğan =

Turkish long-distance swimmer (born 1965)

Personal information
- Born: 1965 (age 60–61) Turkey

Sport
- Sport: Swimming

Ragıp Vural Tandoğan (born 1965) is a Turkish long-distance swimmer. He is a former industrial engineer by profession.

== Personal life ==
Ragıp Vural Tandoğan was born in 1965. After finishing the Kabataş Boys High School in Istanbul in 1982, he studied Industrial Engineering at Istanbul Technical University, and graduated in 1986. He worked many years in various companies as an engineer.

His high school honored him by naming the teacher's room after him, and decorating the room walls with photos of him and his awards.

== Sport career ==
Tandoğan started swimming again, which he was interested in at a young age, to lose weight and live a healthier life. With the encouragement of his friends, he participated at international marathon swim competitions. He does some of his swimming trainings for his competitive swims in the pool of his alma mater.

His first long-distance swim was crossing the 14.4 km (8.9 mi)-long Strait of Gibraltar at his age of 50 on 4 July 2016, from north to south in a time of 5 hours and 10 minutes. The same year on 31 August, in occasion of the Victory Day in Turkey, he swam across the English Channel between England and France taking the33 km (21 mi) distance in 14 hours and 50 minutes. On 29 July 2017, he traversed the 32.3 km (20.1 mi)-long Catalina Strait from Santa Catalina Island to the California mainland in 13 hours and one minute. The next year on 30 June, he completed the 45.9 km (28.5 mi)-long "20 Bridges Swim" around the Manhattan Island in New York City in a time of 10:15.45.

Tandoğan did his first still water swim on Lake Tahoe on 15 July 2022, taking the 19.2 km (11.9 mi) distance from Homewood, California in the west to Glenbrook, Nevada in the east in 7:36.49. One week later on 21 July, he swam the 17.1 km (10.6 mi)-long return route westwards on Lake Tahoe from Cave Rock, Nevada to Vikingsholm, Emerald Bay, California in 8:05.51. He traversed Lake Tahoe for the third time on 29 July 2022, swimming the 34.2 km (21.3 mi) distance from Camp Richardson, California to Incline Village, Nevada in 17:56.43. On 8 September 2023, Tandoğan crossed the California Channel beyween Anacapa Island and mainland swimming the 19.6 km (12.2 mi) distance in 8 hours 33 minutes.

In the night of 6 August 2024, Tandoğan swam 18.6 km (11.6 mi) around Coronado Island in 5 hours and 50 minutes, and became so the first Turkish swimmer to circumnavigate this island. On 18 October 2024, he crossed the 23.5 km (14.6 mi) distance from Cape Ngombo to Senga Bay at Lake Malawi in 14 hours, 59 minutes, and 56 seconds.

Tandoğan expressed that as long as his health allows, he will swim in one ocean and one lake every year. His aim is to complete the "Still Water Eight", which is a group of 8 marathon swims in lakes.

== Achievements ==
- Triple Crown of Open Water Swimming (2018)
- California Triple Crown (2023)

== See also ==
- Bengisu Avcı (born 1996), Turkish female long-distance swimmer,
- Aysu Türkoğlu (born 2001), Turkish female long-distance swimmer,
- Tuna Tunca (born 2003), Turkish male autistic long-distance swimmer.
