= Kevin Murphy (swimmer) =

British swimmer

Personal information
- Born: 1949 (age 76–77) Kingsbury, London, Great Britain

Sport
- Sport: Swimming

Kevin Murphy (born 1949) has swum the English Channel 34 times, more than any other man in history. The overall title of greatest number of successful English Channel swims is held by Chloë McCardel with 44 to her name.

== Swimming career ==
Murphy's total of 34 includes three double-channel swims. He also holds the record for the earliest Channel crossing of the year, set on 29 May 1990.

In 1964, aged just 15, he completed his first long distance swim – 6 hours 29 minutes for the 10 miles (16 km) of Windermere.

In 1968, he completed his first Channel swim – England to France in 15 hours 15 minutes.

In 1970, he became only the third person at that time to complete the two-way Channel swim in 35 hrs 10 mins. In 1971 he was the first person to swim around the Isle of Wight.

In his 1975 two-way swim, he was ordered out of the water because of awful weather after swimming non-stop for 52hrs 30mins. At that point he was halfway back on what would have been a record breaking third leg. This decision by the boat crew wouldn't have been taken lightly, given his famed stamina and ability to withstand the coldest and harshest water conditions, as typified in 1988, when he won the Loch Lomond Scottish ASA Centenary Championship. The conditions were so dreadful that none of the other swimmers was able to finish the race.

In 2000, 32 years after his first Channel success and at the age of 51, he completed his 32nd crossing of the English Channel in a time of 15 hours 10mins, a time faster than his very first crossing in 1968. He thereby became King of the Channel, setting a new record for the most successful Channel swims by a man.

He lost this title temporarily, due in part to pursuing several swims overseas and then from being forced to succumb to major shoulder surgery to remove bone spurs, an affliction caused by 40 years of relentless marathon swimming and training. However, on 29 August 2005, and just 18 months after having surgery, Murphy completed his 33rd crossing in 13 hours 31 mins to become joint holder of the King of the Channel title.

Murphy completed his last (34th) Channel swim on 21 July 2006 in a time of 15 h 14 mins to make him the undisputed King of the Channel.

As of 2006 Murphy still worked as an ITN journalist.

In 2008 he appeared on "The Great British Body" where he was chosen to represent the British male because of his extraordinary achievements.

In 2009, Murphy was inducted into the International Swimming Hall of Fame.

== See also ==
- List of members of the International Swimming Hall of Fame
