= Chloë McCardel =

Australian swimmer

- Born: 10 May 1985 (age 41); Melbourne, Australia
- Occupations: Open water swimmer Swim coach
- Known for: Solo crossings of the English Channel and world record longest open water ocean swim
- Website: www.chloemccardel.com

Chloë McCardel (born 10 May 1985) is an open water swimmer and swim coach from Melbourne, Australia.

== Swims ==
McCardel's past swims include forty-four solo crossings of the English Channel, including eight crossings in one season and three crossings in one week, three double-crossings in 2010, 2012 and 2017 and, in 2015, the fourth person to do a non-stop triple-crossing. She also won the 28.5-mile (46-kilometer) Manhattan Island Marathon Swim in 2010. As of 2021, she holds the world record for the longest unassisted ocean swim, at 124.4 km.

=== Australian record ===
On 22 October 2016 McCardel completed her 20th solo swim across the English Channel. She set a new Australian crossing record, taking the previous record from Des Renford.

On 15 August 2020, she completed her 35th swim of the English Channel.

=== World record ===
On 22 October 2014 McCardel completed an unprecedented swim from South Eleuthera Island to Nassau, Bahamas. 124.4 kilometers (77.3 miles) in 41 hours, 21 minutes. She set a new world record, longest unassisted ocean swim, conducted under the "Rules of Marathon Swimming". This swim was officially ratified by the Marathon Swimming Federation (MSF). The Rules of Marathon Swimming are a globally-endorsed framework of rules and guidelines for any swim in any body of water. The Documented Swims program offers a venue for publishing documentation and requesting peer-reviewed ratification of independent marathon swims. She also won the 2014 MSF "Solo Swim of the Year" (Female) for this World Record swim.

On 13 October 2021, she completed her 44th crossing of the English Channel, giving her the title Queen of the Channel. She surpassed the number of crossings by the previous Queen of the Channel, Alison Streeter.

=== Record attempt ===
On 12 June 2013, she attempted to be the first person to swim across the Straits of Florida from Cuba to Florida without using the protection of a shark cage. She also did not wear a stinger suit or a wet suit. This swim was done to raise funds for three charities; the CanTeen, Can Assist and Swim Across America. McCardel had a 32-person support team that included weather experts and doctors that accompanied her throughout her trip, which was to last about 55–65 hours. She was to eat and drink every half hour.

After 11 hours, McCardel stopped her record swim attempt after she was severely stung by multiple box jellyfish and was in too much pain to continue. She was taken to Key West and was treated for the stings.

== Coaching ==
Across June/July 2015, McCardel, with the support of her team, coached seven relay teams and three solo swimmers (44 swimmers in total) to swim the English Channel. Two of these relays were from the Geelong Grammar School (Victoria, Australia). Geelong were part of the "Channel Conquerors" program which also featured two school age Relay teams from The Arch Academy (San Diego, USA) – coached by Dan Simonelli.

In 2014, she coached and crewed 2x relays to swim the English Channel. These swimmers raised over US$125 000 for a cancer charity – Swim Across America. In July 2015, she also coached and crewed one of the 2014 English Channel relay fundraisers, Grant Wentworth, to swim between Cape Cod and Nantucket (USA) and, in doing so, raising $150 000 for Swim Across America.

== Awards ==
Channel Swimming Association (CSA)

- 2018 CSA Fastest swim on the highest tide
- 2017 CSA Fastest 2 way swim
- 2016 CSA Gold medal for the fastest swim of the year in 8 hours 51 minutes
- 2016 CSA Sotiraki trophy for the fastest swim by a lady in 8 hours 51 minutes
- 2016 CSA Belhedi trophy for the swim on the highest tide
- 2016 CSA Most solo crossings in a season in history with 8 crossings
- 2016 Inducted in the International Marathon Swimming Hall of Fame
- 2015 Marathon Swimmers Federation solo swim of the year award for the most outstanding solo marathon swim of 2015 (Three-way English Channel swim. 63 miles (101.4 km) in 36 hours, 12 minutes)
- 2015 CSA Oldman trophy for the British Long Distance Swimming Association swimmer of the year
- 2015 CSA Mark Rickhuss trophy for the fastest 2 way swim in 22 hours 42 minutes
- 2015 CSA Captain Webb trophy for the fastest 3 way swim in 36 hours 12 minutes
- 2015 CSA Sotiraki trophy for the fastest swim by a lady in 8 hours 52 minutes
- 2015 CSA Van Audenaerde trophy for the greatest feat of endurance
- 2015 CSA Rosemary George trophy for the most meritorious swim of the year
- 2014 Marathon Swimmers Federation solo swim of the year award for the most outstanding solo marathon swim of 2014 (Unprecedented swim from South Eleuthera Island to Nassau, Bahamas. 124.4 kilometers (77.3 miles) in 41 hours, 21 minutes. New world record, longest unassisted ocean swim.)
- 2014 CSA Sotirake trophy for the fastest swim by a lady 9 hours 12 minutes
- 2012 CSA Gold medal for fastest swim of the year 9 hours 30 minutes
- 2012 CSA Sotirake trophy for the fastest swim by a lady 9 hours 30 minutes
- 2012 CSA Mark Rickhuss trophy for the fastest two-way swim 19 hours 20 minutes
- 2011 CSA Gold medal for fastest swim of the year 9 hours 3 minutes
- 2011 CSA Sotirake trophy for fastest swim by a lady 9 hours 3 minutes
- 2010 Nomination for open water swimming performance of the year on (Openwatersource.com)
- 2010 CSA Mark Rickhuss memorial trophy (Fastest solo two-way swim of the year) 21 hours 48 minutes
- 2010 The Van Audenaerde trophy for greatest feat of endurance

== See also ==
- English Channel
- King of the Channel
- List of successful English Channel swimmers
