= Colin O'Brady =

American adventurer (born 1985)

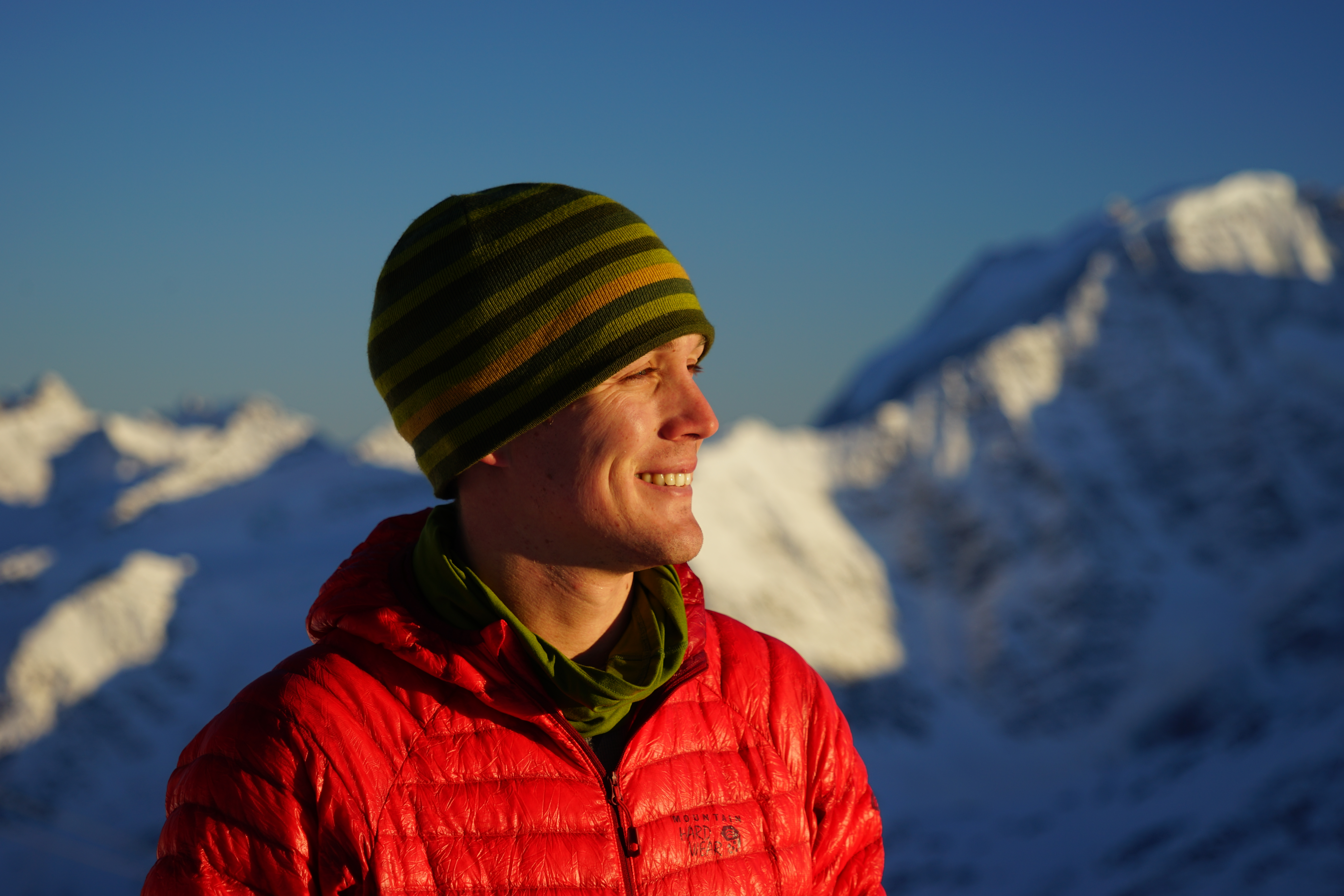
- O'Brady in 2016

Personal information
- Born: Colin Timothy O'Brady; March 16, 1985 (age 41) Olympia, Washington, U.S.
- Education: Yale University
- Occupations: Pro Endurance Athlete, Rowing
- Years active: 2009–present
- Spouse: Jenna Besaw (m. 2017; div. 2024)
- Website: colinobrady.com

Sport
- Sport: Mountaineer, professional triathlete

Achievements and titles
- Highest world ranking: 3x world record speed holder; Explorers Grand Slam (Last Degree), Three Poles Challenge, 50 Highest Points
- Updated on April 23, 2016

Colin Timothy O'Brady (born March 16, 1985) is an American professional endurance athlete, motivational speaker and adventurer. He is a former professional triathlete, representing the United States on the ITU Triathlon World Cup circuit.

O'Brady is a four-time world record holder. In 2016 he set the Explorers Grand Slam (Last Degree). He became the fastest person to complete the adventurers challenges in 139 days and 131 days, respectively. In the summer of 2018, O'Brady set the speed record for the 50 US High Points in 21 days.

On December 26, 2018, he completed a solo crossing of the land mass of Antarctica, excluding the ice shelves, using the South Pole Traverse (SPoT) vehicle road during the last 366 miles (589 km) of the journey.

== Early life and education ==
Colin Timothy O'Brady was born on March 16, 1985, in Olympia, Washington, but was raised in Portland, Oregon. He attended the Franciscan Montessori Earth School and Mt. Tabor Middle School, and graduated from Lincoln High School in 2002.

O'Brady was a youth soccer star and Oregon State Swimming Champion. He was recruited for both collegiate swimming and soccer in high school. He accepted a recruitment to swim for the Yale Bulldogs swimming and diving team where he competed on the NCAA Division I varsity team in the 100 and 200 meter Breaststroke. He graduated from Yale University in 2006 and received a Bachelor of Arts in Economics.

In 2007, O'Brady began what was planned as a year-long backpacking trip around the world. In January 2008, on the island of Koh Tao, Thailand, he suffered a devastating burn injury. Though he was warned he might never again walk normally, he took his first step the following month and was determined to make a full recovery.

== Career ==
=== Early career and professional triathlete ===
O'Brady moved to Chicago, where he took a job as a commodities trader following the accident. He learned how to walk again, and for a year focused on physical rehabilitation. He began to train for triathlon: swimming, cycling, and running.

In May 2009 he won a sprint-distance triathlon in Racine, Wisconsin, and in August 2009 he placed 1st overall amateur in the Olympic-distance Chicago Triathlon. He then placed in the age-group nationals in Tuscaloosa, Alabama, which earned him a position on Team USA at the 2010 World Triathlon Championships in Budapest, Hungary. In late 2009, encouraged by his mentor, financier Brian Gelber, O'Brady quit his job to pursue a career as a professional athlete. With Gelber as a sponsor, he moved to Australia to train in a more temperate climate. O'Brady has since completed more than 50 triathlons, ranging from sprint distance to Ironman competitions.

O'Brady completed Ironman Japan in August 2015, his final triathlon race and placed 6th in the Pro division.

=== Endurance and adventurer ===
Following his retirement from triathlon, O'Brady and his then-fiancée Jenna Besaw created Beyond 7/2, a not-for-profit world record journey to inspire kids and communities to live active, healthy lives. O'Brady aimed to conquer the Explorers Grand Slam (Last Degree), an adventurer's challenge to climb the highest mountain on each of the seven continents and complete expeditions to both the North and South Poles in world record time. O'Brady and Besaw financed the Grand Slam attempt through sponsorships from Gelber Group, Nike, Columbia Sportswear, and Mountain Hardwear, among others. The project raised funds and awareness to benefit the Alliance for a Healthier Generation, a non-profit organization that aims to combat childhood obesity.

O'Brady left Portland on December 25, 2015, flying to Chile and then Union Glacier in Antarctica. In January 2016, O'Brady began the Explorers Grand Slam. O'Brady was joined on parts of his Beyond 7/2 journey by various climbing partners and as a paying client with guides including polar explorer Eric Larsen, Vern Tejas and fellow mountaineer Maria (Masha) Gordon.

O'Brady became the fastest person (male) to complete the Explorers Grand Slam (Last Degree) when he reached the summit of Denali in Alaska on May 27, 2016, and set a new speed record of 139 days. He bested the previous male record of 197 days set by Richard Parks in 2011. O'Brady is the 36th person to complete the Explorers Grand Slam (Last Degree) and the current record holder. O'Brady completed 10 expeditions in total to fulfill both the Bass and Messner lists.

O'Brady completed both the Bass and Messner lists for the Seven Summits speed record, climbing Everest, Aconcagua, Denali, Kilimanjaro, Elbrus, Puncak Jaya, Vinson (the "Messner version").

O'Brady is the fastest to complete the Three Poles Challenge, an adventurer’s challenge to reach the North Pole, the South Pole and the summit of Mount Everest. He began the challenge in Antarctica on January 10, 2016, reached the North Pole on April 19, and summited Mount Everest on May 19, 2016.

In the summer of 2018, aided by a small support team, O'Brady broke the speed record for the 50 US High Points Challenge when he climbed the highest point in each of the 50 states of the United States in just 21 days, 9 hours, and 48 minutes. While reaching each high point, he invited local residents of all ages and backgrounds to come out to join him in setting a new world record; this piece of the project was coined "The Forrest Gump Effect".

On December 26, 2018, O’Brady completed a solo and unsupported crossing of parts of Antarctica from the Messner start to the beginning of the Ross Ice Shelf by following the South Pole Overland Traverse ice highway. He completed the 932 mile journey in 54 days, finishing ahead of explorer Louis Rudd who was also attempting the feat. Peter Wilson has disputed this claim that the trek was unassisted due to the ice highway being groomed and maintained.

In December 2019, O'Brady acted as the first mate in a six-man team on the first man-powered crossing of Drake Passage, the body of water between South America and Antarctica. It took 13 days and more than 700 miles (1,100 km) in a boat that was 29 feet (8.8 m) long.

In June 2021, O'Brady summited Mount Everest alongside his wife, Jenna Besaw, completing her first summit of the mountain. In 2025, O'Brady attempted a 2,000 mile solo unsupported crossing of Antarctica, but had to abort the attempt after 100 days and roughly 60% of the total distance.

== Personal life ==
O'Brady is the son of Eileen Brady, businesswoman and politician who ran unsuccessfully for mayor of Portland, Oregon. In 2017, O'Brady married Jenna Besaw. In 2024, he announced on Instagram that the couple had divorced following a period of separation.

== World records ==
- Fastest person (man) to complete the Explorers Grand Slam
- Fastest person (man) to complete the Three Poles Challenge
- Fastest person (man) to complete the 50 Highest Points in all 50 US States
- Youngest person to row on the Southern Ocean (34 years 272 days old)

== Explorers Grand Slam (Last Degree) ==
Mountain	Elevation	Continent	Country	Date Summited
South Pole	9,301 ft (2,835 m)	Antarctica		January 10, 2016
Mount Vinson	16,050 ft (4,892 m)	Antarctica		January 17, 2016
Aconcagua	22,838 ft (6,961 m)	South America	Argentina	January 31, 2016
Mount Kilimanjaro	19,341 ft (5,895 m)	Africa	Tanzania	February 9, 2016
Mount Kosciuszko (Bass List)	7,310 ft (2,228 m)	Australia	Australia	February 17, 2016
Carstensz Pyramid Puncak Jaya (Messner List)	16,024 ft (4,884 m)	Oceania	Indonesia	March 4, 2016
Mount Elbrus	18,510 ft (5,642 m)	Europe	Russia	March 10, 2016
North Pole	0 ft			April 19, 2016
Mount Everest	29,029 ft (8,848 m)	Asia	Nepal	May 19, 2016
Denali	20,322 ft (6,194 m)	North America	United States	May 27, 2016
