= Alison Streeter =

British swimmer

Personal information
- Born: 1964 (age 61–62)

Sport
- Sport: Swimming
- Strokes: Long-distance swimming

Alison Jane Streeter is a British long-distance swimmer.

== Biography ==
Streeter has swum across the English Channel 43 times, the most crossings done by an individual until surpassed by Chloe McCardel on 13 October 2021. She also completed seven Channel crossings in one year. Her 1988 Channel swim, from France to England, set a female record of 8 hours 48 minutes. She was the first woman to swim the Channel three ways non-stop in 1990, taking 34h40 min for the feat.

In 1988, Streeter became the first woman to swim across the North Channel, between Northern Ireland and Scotland, a feat she repeated in 1989 and 1997. She currently holds the record for the highest number of crossings.

She formerly worked as a currency trader in London, and now spends part of her life in Adelaide (Seacliff) and the summers in Dover as a Channel Swim boat pilot.

The Queen appointed Streeter a Member of the Order of the British Empire (MBE) in the 1991 Birthday Honours for her swimming prowess and charity fundraising. To date she has raised over £100,000 for various charities.

In May 2006, she was inducted into the International Swimming Hall of Fame.

== British records ==
1984 Catalina Channel (Santa Catalina Island, California) 9 h 33 min
1987 Capri – Naples 8 h 35 min
1990 Round Manhattan Island 6 h 47 min
1995 Double English Channel 20 h 55 min
1998 Toreneous Strait, Greece 7 h 42 min
1998 Yarra River St Kilda Pier and return 9 h 40 min

== World records (men and women) ==
1984 Round Isle of Wight 100 km 21 h 2 min
1985 Richmond, London to Gravesend, Kent (Tidal Thames) 68 km 14 h 28 min
1986 Gravesend, Kent to Richmond, London 68 km 16 h exactly
1986 Four Piers (Solent) 23 km 4 h 37 min
1988 Ireland to Scotland – 1st Woman 9 h 53 min and fastest time (men and women)
1989 Scotland to Ireland 1st Person to succeed 10 h 4 min
1997 Scotland to Ireland fastest time 10 h 2 min
1989 Round Jersey (Channel Islands) 9 h 53 min
1995 Overall record holder for number of English Channel swims – 43 crossings; men's record is 34 held by Kevin Murphy.
1998 Isles of Scilly to Cornwall 1st person 28 miles 15 h 11 min

== See also ==
- List of members of the International Swimming Hall of Fame
