= Drake Passage =

Strait connecting the Atlantic, Pacific, and Southern Oceans

Coordinates: 58°35′S 65°54′W

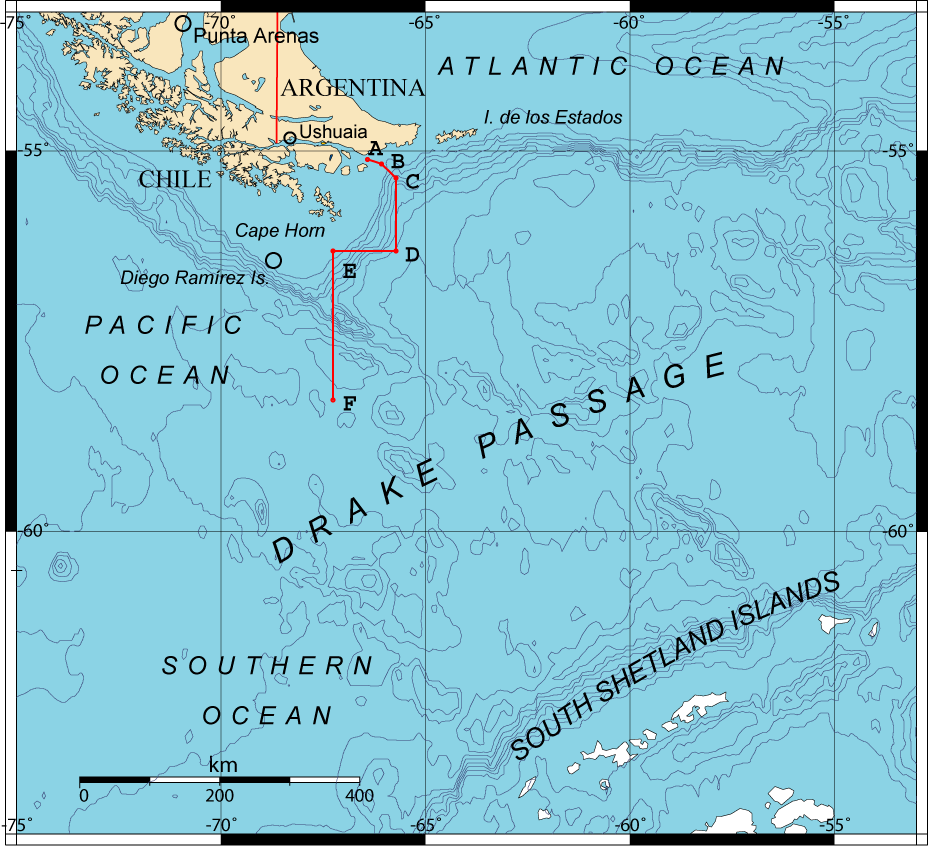
Drake Passage showing the boundary points A, B, C, D, E and F accorded by the Treaty of Peace and Friendship of 1984 between Chile and Argentina

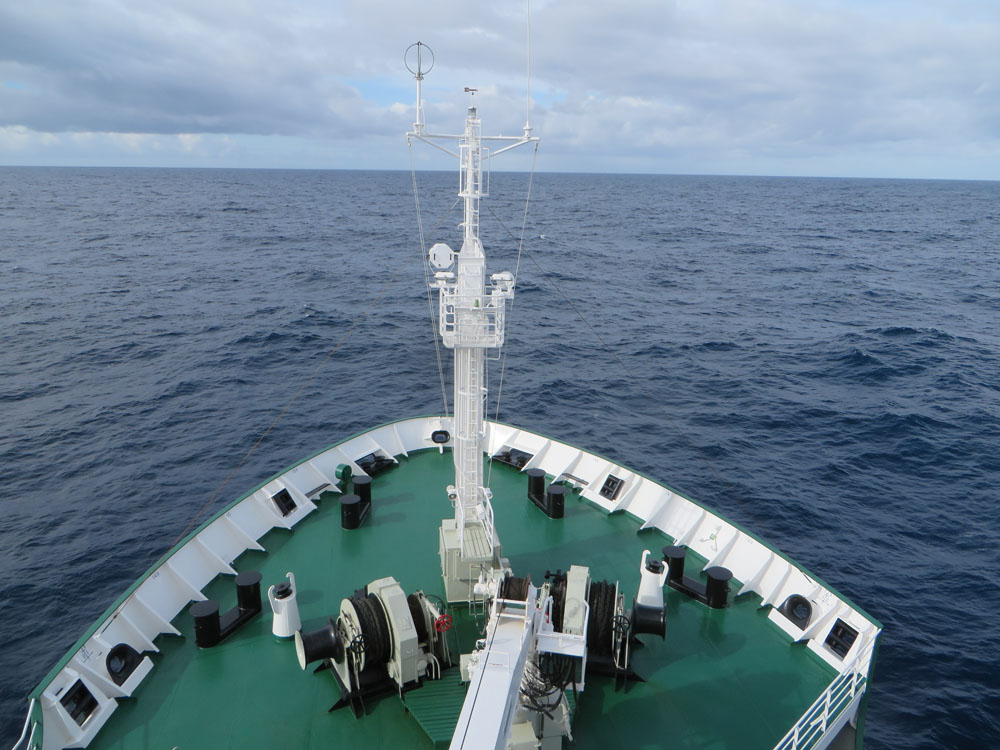
Tourist expedition ship sailing across the Drake Passage to Antarctica

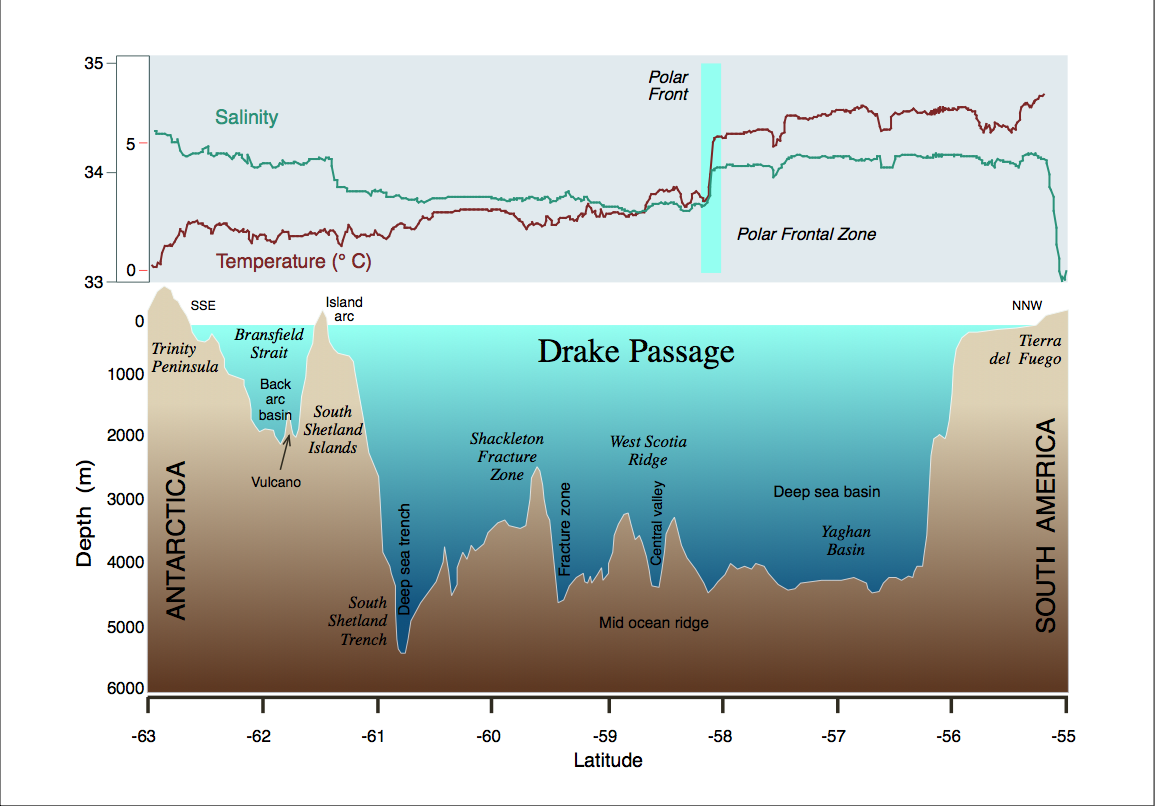
Depth profile with salinity and temperature for surface

The Drake Passage or Sea of Hoces (Mar de Hoces) is the body of water between Cape Horn in Chile at the southern extreme of the South American mainland and the South Shetland Islands of Antarctica. It connects the southwestern part of the Atlantic Ocean (Scotia Sea) with the southeastern part of the Pacific Ocean. The passage is named after the 16th-century English explorer and privateer Sir Francis Drake.

Traversing the Drake Passage is considered one of the most treacherous voyages for ships to make. The Antarctic Circumpolar Current, which runs through it, meets no resistance from any landmass, and waves top 40 feet (12 m), giving it a reputation for being "the most powerful convergence of seas".

As the Drake Passage is the narrowest passage (choke point) around Antarctica, it strongly influences Antarctic and global oceanic circulation, as well as global climate patterns. The bathymetry of the Drake Passage plays an important part in the global mixing of oceanic water. Part of the water body is named Southern Zone Sea.

== History ==
In 1525, the Spanish navigator, Francisco de Hoces, is assumed to have discovered the Drake Passage after being blown south away from the entrance of the Strait of Magellan. Though he and his ship and crew disappeared, and his exact path and fate are unknown, the Drake Passage is referred to as the Mar de Hoces (Sea of Hoces) in Spanish maps and sources, while in other Spanish-speaking countries it is mostly known also as Pasaje de Drake (in Argentina, mainly), or Paso Drake (in Chile, mainly).

The passage received its English name from Sir Francis Drake during his circumnavigation. After passing in 1578 through the Strait of Magellan with Marigold, Elizabeth, and his flagship Golden Hind, Drake entered the Pacific Ocean and was blown far south in a tempest. Marigold was lost and Elizabeth abandoned the fleet. Only Drake's Golden Hind entered the passage. This incident demonstrated to the English that there was open water south of South America.

In 1616, Dutch navigator Willem Schouten became the first to sail around Cape Horn and through the Drake Passage.

On December 25, 2019, a crew of six explorers successfully rowed across the passage, becoming the first in history to do so. This accomplishment became the subject of a 2020 documentary, The Impossible Row.

== Geography ==
The Drake Passage opened when Antarctica separated from South America due to plate tectonics, however, there is much debate about when this occurred, with estimates ranging from 49 to 17 million years ago. The Shackleton fracture zone is under the sea on the Drake Passage zone.

The opening had a major effect on the global oceans due to deep currents, such as the Antarctic Circumpolar Current (ACC). This opening could have been a primary cause of changes in global circulation and climate, as well as the rapid expansion of Antarctic ice sheets, because, as Antarctica was encircled by ocean currents, it was cut off from receiving heat from warmer regions.

The 800-kilometre-wide (500 mi) passage between Cape Horn and Livingston Island is the shortest crossing from Antarctica to another landmass. The boundary between the Atlantic and Pacific Oceans is sometimes taken to be a line drawn from Cape Horn to Snow Island (130 kilometres (81 mi) north of mainland Antarctica), though the International Hydrographic Organization defines it as the meridian that passes through Cape Horn: 67° 16′ W. Both lines lie within the Drake Passage.

The other two passages around the southern extremity of South America—the Strait of Magellan and the Beagle Channel—have frequent narrows, leaving little maneuvering room for a ship, as well as unpredictable winds and tidal currents. Most sailing ships thus prefer the Drake Passage, which is open water for hundreds of miles.

No significant land sits at the latitudes of the Drake Passage. This is important to the unimpeded eastward flow of the Antarctic Circumpolar Current, which carries a huge volume of water through the passage and around Antarctica.

The passage hosts whales, dolphins, and seabirds including giant petrels, other petrels, albatrosses, and penguins.

== Importance in physical oceanography ==
The Drake Passage (middle of image) in relation to the global thermohaline circulation (animation)

The presence of the Drake Passageway allows the three main ocean basins (Atlantic, Pacific and Southern) to be connected via the Antarctic Circumpolar current (ACC), the strongest oceanic current, with an estimated transport of 100–150 Sv (Sverdrups, million m^{3}/s). This flow is the only large-scale exchange occurring between the global oceans, and the Drake passage is the narrowest passage on its flow around Antarctica. As such, a significant amount of research has been done in understanding how the shape of the Drake passage (bathymetry and width) affects the global climate.

=== Oceanic and climate interactions ===
Major features of the modern ocean's temperature and salinity fields, including the overall thermal asymmetry between the hemispheres, the relative saltiness of deep water formed in the northern hemisphere, and the existence of a transequatorial conveyor circulation, develop after Drake Passage is opened.

The plot shows a yearly average (2020) of the surface current strength (from GODAS dataset), together with streamlines. Following the streamlines, it is easy to see that the current is not closed in itself but interacts with the other ocean basins (connecting them). The Drake Passage plays a major role in this mechanism.

The importance of an open Drake Passage extends farther than the Southern Ocean latitudes. The Roaring Forties and the Furious Fifties blow around Antarctica and drive the Antarctic Circumpolar Current (ACC). As a result of Ekman Transport, water gets transported northward from the ACC (on the left-hand side while facing the stream direction). Using a Lagrangian approach, water parcels passing through the Drake Passage can be followed in their journey in the oceans. Around 23 Sv of water is transported from the Drake Passage to the equator, mainly in the Atlantic and Pacific Oceans. This value is not far from the Gulf Stream transport in the Florida Strait (33 Sv), but is an order of magnitude lower than the transport of the ACC (100–150 Sv). Water transported from the Southern Ocean to the Northern Hemisphere contributes to the global mass balance and permits the meridional circulation across the oceans.

Several studies have linked the current shape of the Drake Passage to an effective Atlantic meridional overturning circulation (AMOC). Models have been run with different widths and depths of the Drake Passage, and consequent changes in the global oceanic circulation and temperature distribution have been analyzed: It appears that the "conveyor belt" of the global thermohaline circulation appears only in presence of an open Drake Passage, subject to wind forcing. With a closed Drake Passage, there is no North Atlantic Deep Water (NADW) cell, and no ACC. With a shallower Drake Passage, a weak ACC appears, but still no NADW cell.

The Drake Passage influences the global surface temperature and Atlantic circulation.

It has also been shown that present-day distribution of dissolved inorganic carbon can be obtained only with an open Drake Passage.

Regarding the global surface temperature, an open (and sufficiently deep) Drake Passage cools the Southern Ocean and warms the high latitudes of the Northern Hemisphere. The isolation of Antarctica by the ACC (that can flow only with an open Drake Passage) is credited by many researchers with causing the glaciation of the continent and global cooling in the Eocene epoch.

=== Turbulence and mixing ===
Diapycnal mixing is the process by which different layers of a stratified fluid mix. It directly affects vertical gradients, thus it is of great importance to all gradient-driven types of transport and circulation (including thermohaline circulation). Mixing drives the global thermohaline circulation; without internal mixing, cooler water would never rise above warmer water, and there would be no density (buoyancy)-driven circulation. However, mixing in the interior of most of the ocean is thought to be ten times weaker than required to support the global circulation. It has been hypothesised that the extra-mixing can be ascribed to breaking of internal waves (Lee waves). When a stratified fluid reaches an internal obstacle, a wave is created that can eventually break, mixing the fluid's layers. It has been estimated that the diapycnal diffusivity in the Drake Passage is ~20 times the value immediately to the west in the Pacific sector of the Antarctic Circumpolar Current (ACC). Much of the energy that is dissipated through internal wave breaking (around 20% of the wind energy put into the ocean) is dissipated in the Southern Ocean.

In short, without the coarse topography in the depths of the Drake Passage, oceanic internal mixing would be weaker, and the global circulation would be affected.

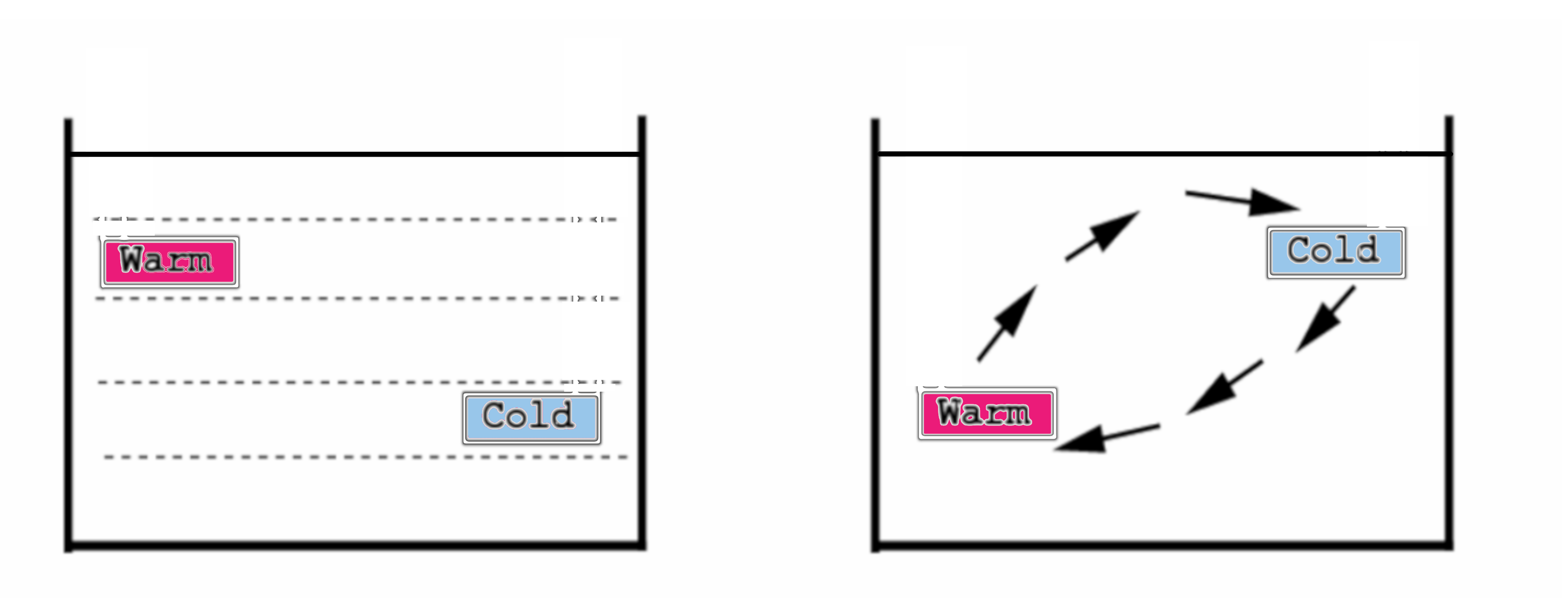
Density (buoyancy) drives an internal circulation only if the denser (colder or saltier) water mass lays above the less dense (warmer or less salty) one. In absence of any perturbation, the fluid assumes a stratified form. Neglecting salinity differences, the only possible drivers of such a circulation are vertical temperature differences. However, water gets heated and cooled at the same level, namely at the surface at the equator and at the surface at the poles. The force that pushes colder water above warmer water is internal mixing, which is more intense in presence of rough topography, such as in the Drake Passage.

=== Historical importance in oceanographic observations ===
Worldwide satellite measurements of oceanic properties have been available since the 1980s. Before then, data could be only gathered through oceanic ships taking direct measurements. The Antarctic Circumpolar Current (ACC) has been (and is) surveyed making repeated transects. South America and the Antarctic Peninsula constrain the ACC in the Drake Passage; the convenience of measuring the ACC across the passage lays in the clear boundaries of the current in that stripe. Even after the advent of satellite altimetry data, direct observations in the Drake Passage have not lost their exceptionality. The relative shallowness and narrowness of the passage makes it particularly suitable to assess the validity of horizontally and vertically changing quantities (such as velocity in Ekman's theory).

In addition, the strength of the ACC makes meanders and pinching cold-core cyclonic rings easier to observe.

== Fauna ==
Wildlife in the Drake Passage includes the following species:

=== Birds ===
- Sooty shearwater
- White-chinned petrel
- Southern giant petrel
- Northern giant-petrel
- Black-browed albatross
- Campbell albatross
- Grey-headed albatross
- Atlantic yellow-nosed albatross
- Indian yellow-nosed albatross
- Buller's albatross
- Salvin's albatross
- Shy albatross
- Southern royal albatross
- Northern royal albatross
- Wandering albatross
- Light-mantled albatross
- Sooty albatross
- Great shearwater
- Great-winged petrel
- Kerguelen petrel
- Southern fulmar
- Cape petrel
- Soft-plumaged petrel
- White-headed petrel
- Atlantic petrel
- Grey petrel
- Antarctic prion
- Slender-billed prion
- Blue petrel
- Black-bellied storm petrel
- Wilson's storm-petrel

=== Cetaceans ===
- Fin whale
- Sei whale
- Blue whale
- Humpback whale
- Southern right whale
- Sperm whale
- Hourglass dolphin
- Southern right whale dolphin
- Long-finned pilot whale
- Arnoux's beaked whale
- Southern bottlenose whale
- Cuvier's beaked whale
- Strap-toothed whale
- Gray's beaked whale
- Hector's beaked whale

== Gallery ==
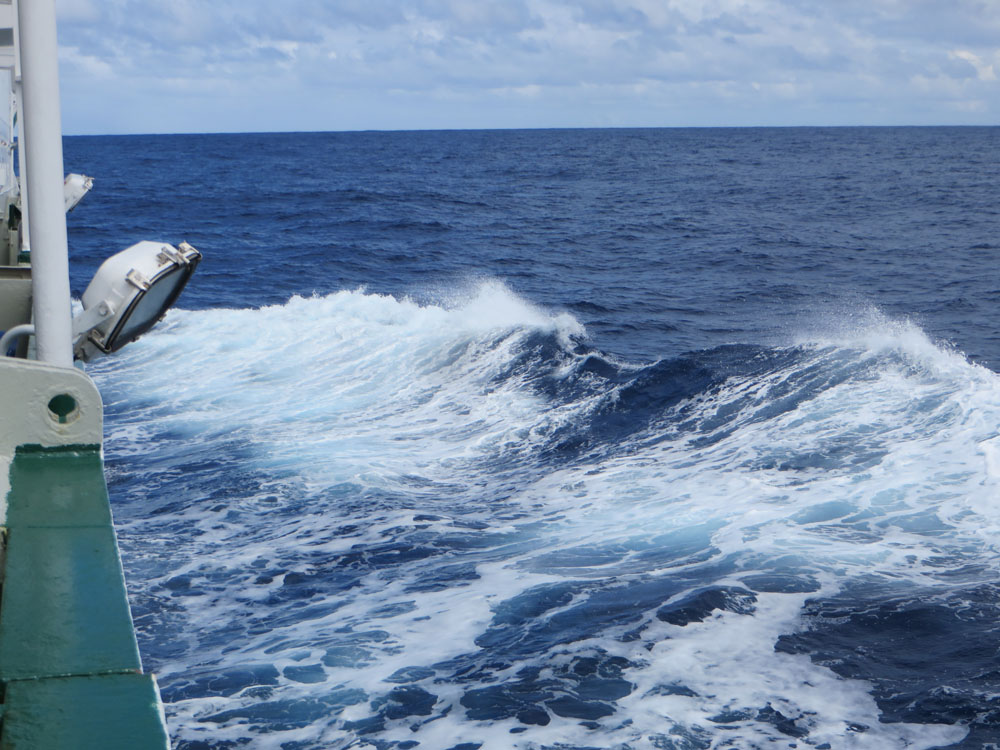
Rough seas are common in the Drake Passage

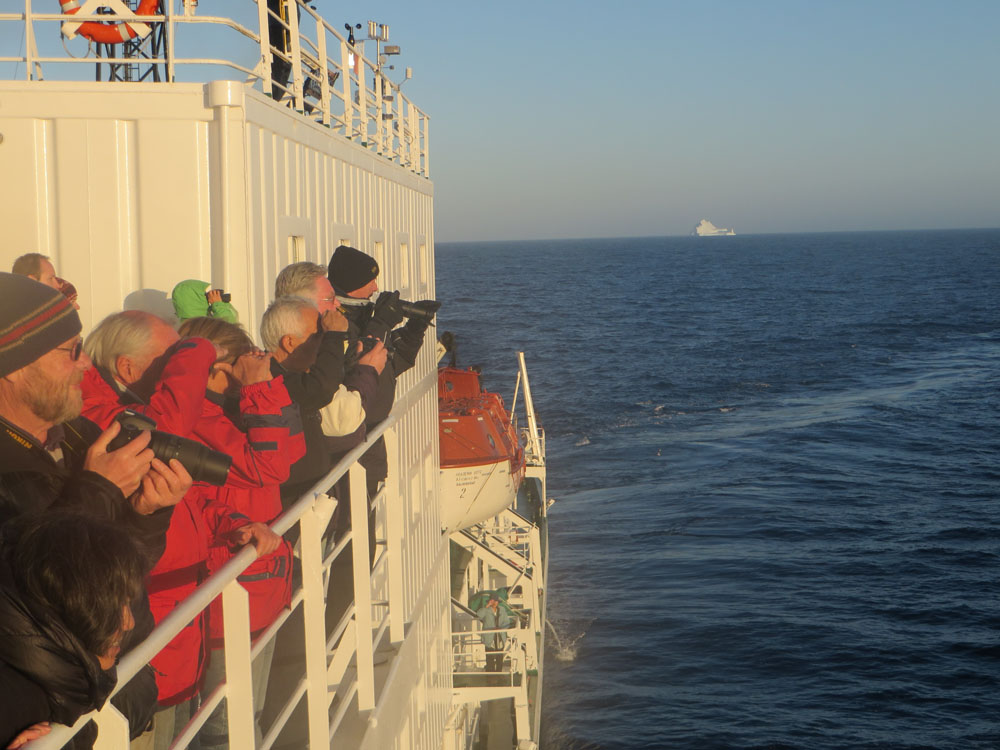
Tourists watch whales in the Drake Passage

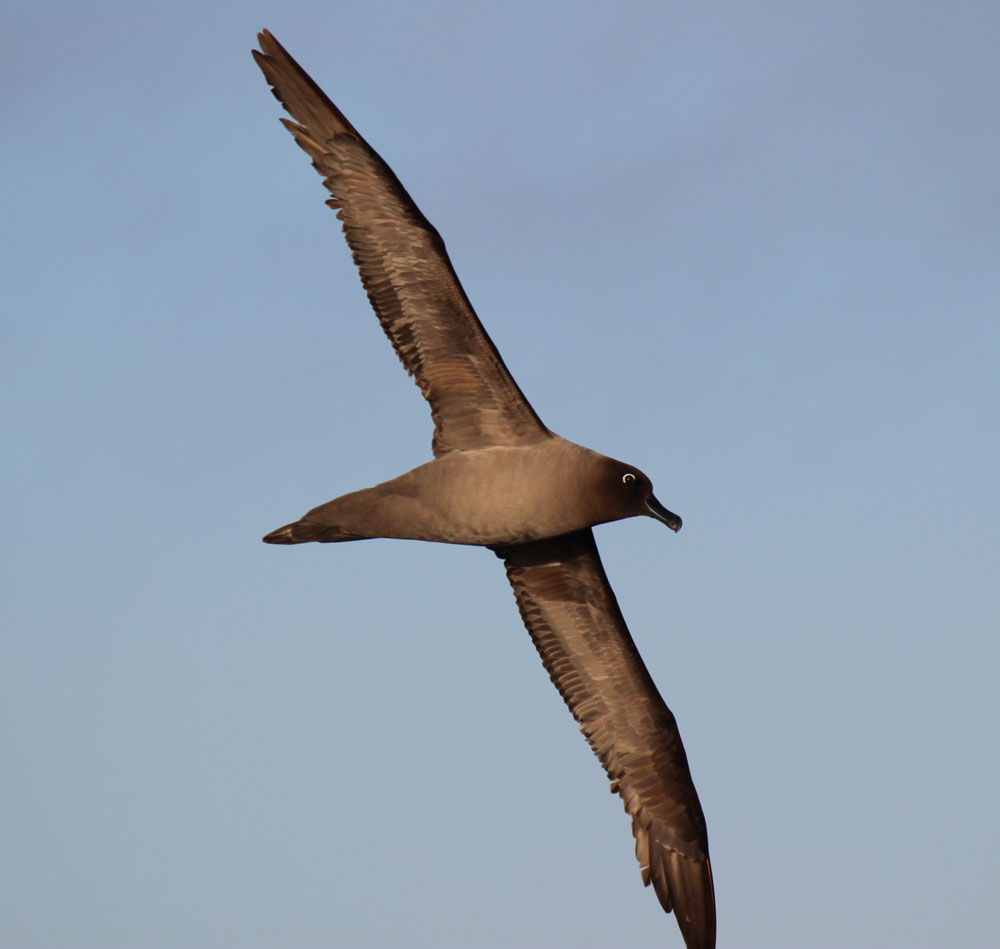
A light-mantled sooty albatross flying over the Drake Passage

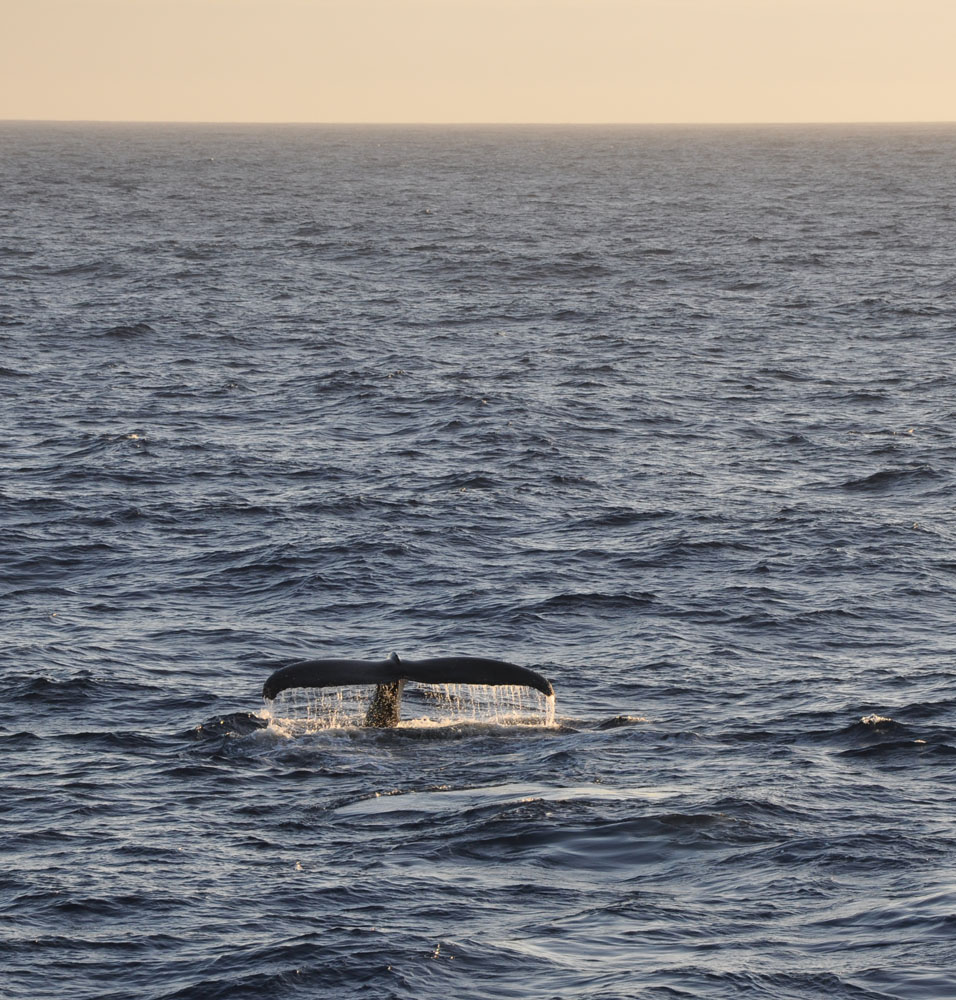
Humpback whales are a common sight in the Drake Passage

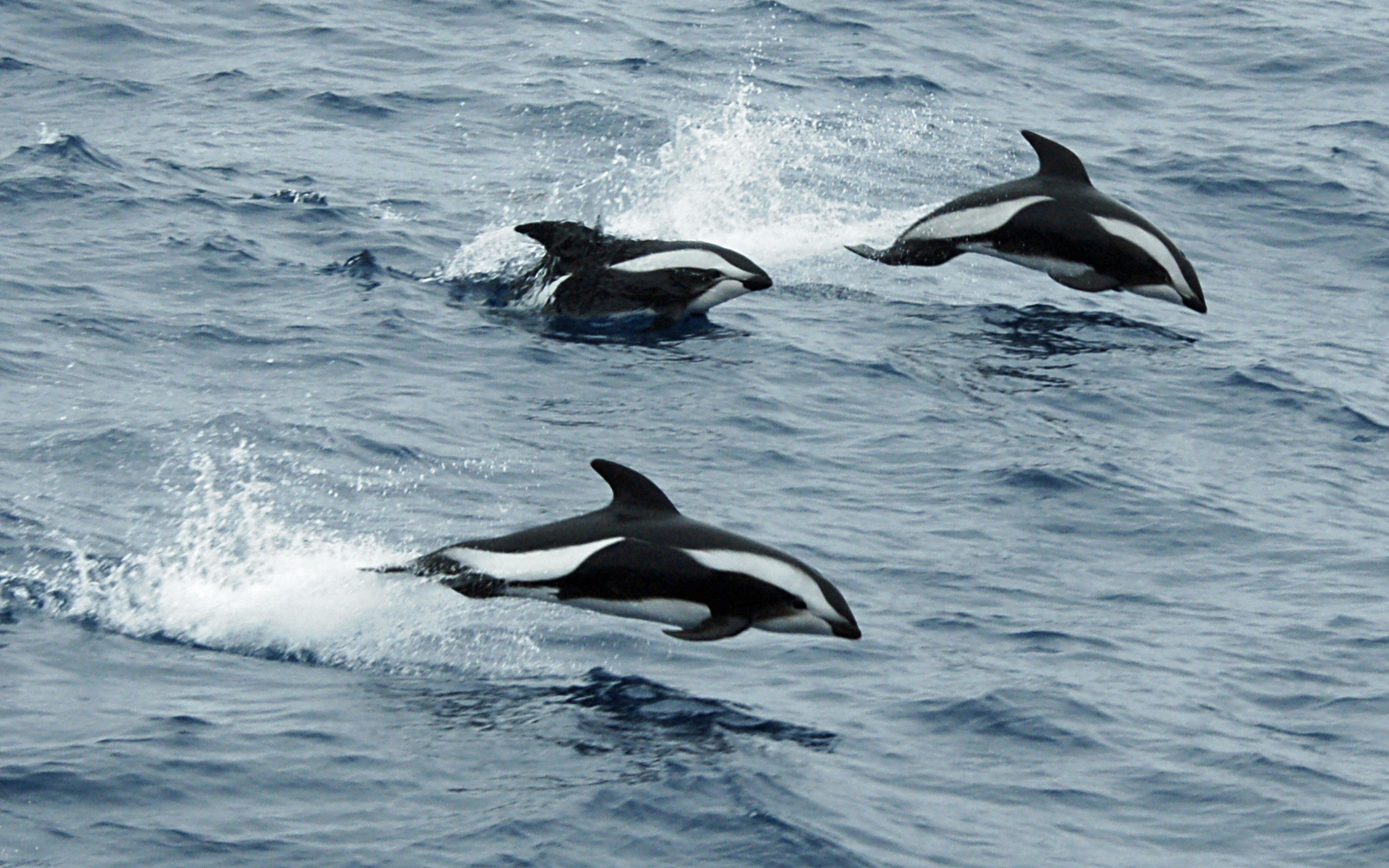
Hourglass dolphins leaping in the Passage

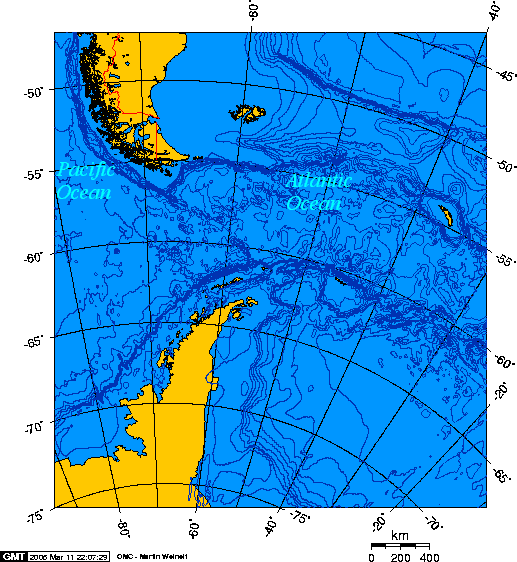
Drake Passage or Mar de Hoces between South America and Antarctica

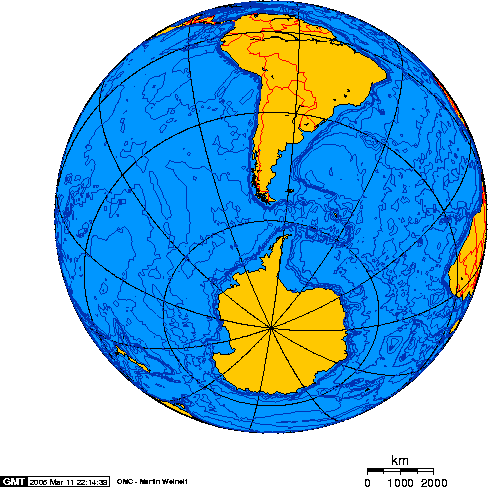
Drake Passage

== Notable people ==
- Jamie Douglas-Hamilton (living), adventurer
- Francisco de Hoces (deceased), sailor
- Bárbara Hernández (living), open water swimmer

== See also ==
- Southern Zone Sea
- Shackleton fracture zone
- Elizabeth Island (Cape Horn)
- Garcia de Nodal expedition
- Bransfield Strait
- Sars Bank
- Timeline of Francis Drake's circumnavigation
