= Young Woman and the Sea (soundtrack) =

Young Woman and the Sea (Original Score)

Film score by Amelia Warner
- Released: May 31, 2024
- Studio: AIR
- Genre: Contemporary classical
- Length: 55:41
- Label: Walt Disney
- Producer: Amelia Warner; Lorne Balfe

Amelia Warner chronology
Mr. Malcolm's List (Original Motion Picture Soundtrack) (2022)	Young Woman and the Sea (Original Score) (2024)

Young Woman and the Sea (Original Score) is the soundtrack album to the 2024 film Young Woman and the Sea directed by Joachim Rønning for Walt Disney Pictures and Jerry Bruckheimer Films. Based on the eponymous 2009 novel by Glenn Stout, the film stars Daisy Ridley as Gertrude Ederle, an American competitive swimmer who became the first woman to swim across the English Channel. The original score was composed by Amelia Warner and released by Walt Disney Records on May 31, 2024.

== Background ==
In January 2023, it was announced that Amelia Warner would compose the musical score for Young Woman and the Sea. Warner re-watched some of her favorite sports films, including Chariots of Fire (1981), A League of Their Own (1992), Rudy (1993), and Remember the Titans (2000) to find influences for composing the score.

Warner was tasked to provide a main theme for Trudy to represent her personality and to sound "both sorrowful and also triumphant". She had to showcase numerous facets of Trudy, while also needed to feel intimate and heroic, which felt it more challenging. One of the important aspects on composing the score was to find a particular theme which would work either on a piano, cello or an orchestra, which connects Trudy's relationship with her family, which should be personal and emotional. Another theme, "Free Spirit", was created to represent Trudy's playful, eccentric and unconventional side, as Trudy was different from the other girls, and the theme was composed in that manner, which represented her childlike nature. Warner composed the sports theme "The Race" which used for her swimming sections, and would represent her athletic side, resulting in a "bombastic, bold" theme; while the particular cue emphasized on percussions, Warner made use of the electric cello and percussion instruments when scoring the swimming scenes in order to cut through the white noise from splashing.

Despite the 1920s setting, Warner decided to use more modern and electronic elements, so that it should represent her power and strength. The utilization of electric cello was to provide an "electronic pulse that made things feel a bit more exciting". Warner further emphasized on using synthesizers as it was an important part in the score, and layering those instruments had been a big part while composing. Warner admitted that the use of modern elements in the score increased the particular energy viscerally in those racing sequences and montages. The film's epilogue, featuring archive footage of Trudy, features a slowed-down theme with piano and choir.

The score was recorded over eight days at AIR Studios, London; Warner preferred as her first choice to record the score, as its atmosphere had preferred her to record an orchestral and contemporary musical. She made use of the studio's adjustable canopy to decrease the hall reverb when desired. Lorne Balfe further produced the score with Warner.

== Release ==
The score was released under the Walt Disney Records label on May 31, 2024, the same day as the film.

== Reception ==
Lovia Gyarkye of The Hollywood Reporter wrote "A soaring, string-heavy score composed by Amelia Warner assumes the role of emotional supervisor early on, calibrating our mood to triumph and tragedy."

Pete Hammond of Deadline Hollywood described the score as "sweeping", whereas Derek Smith of Slant Magazine called it as "syrupy, relentlessly rousing". Calling it as a "triumphal score", Katie Walsh of Los Angeles Times added that there is a hint of "Pirates of the Caribbean-style jauntiness to the powerful orchestration that adds to the sense of melodrama at play". Mae Abdulbaki of Screen Rant wrote "The score by Amelia Warner is also fantastic, underscoring every heartbreak and triumph in Trudy's life." William Bibbiani of TheWrap described the score as "glorious sweep".

== Accolades ==
The score was shortlisted as one among the 15 contenders for the Academy Award for Best Original Score at the 97th Academy Awards, but was not selected in the final nominations. It was nominated for the Public Choice award at the World Soundtrack Awards 2024.

== Track listing ==
All tracks are written by Amelia Warner.

Young Woman and the Sea (Original Score) track listing
No.	Title	Length
1.	"Sisters"	2:18
2.	"Trudy Survives"	2:43
3.	"First Race"	2:23
4.	"Free Spirit"	1:35
5.	"Sisters Race the Australians"	3:42
6.	"Winning Montage"	1:15
7.	"1924 Olympic Races"	1:11
8.	"My Hero Was You"	1:17
9.	"The Channel Plan"	2:35
10.	"Swim to Penners"	2:31
11.	"Travel to the Channel"	0:53
12.	"First Attempt"	1:51
13.	"Wolfe's Sabotage"	2:20
14.	"Reaction to Failure"	1:42
15.	"Family Arrives"	1:01
16.	"Trudy Escapes"	2:05
17.	"We Go to England or Die Trying"	1:49
18.	"Jellyfish"	3:00
19.	"Swim Trudy Swim"	1:48
20.	"Entering the Shallows"	3:31
21.	"Lost in the Shallows"	4:35
22.	"Distant Lights"	1:57
23.	"Beach Celebration"	3:39
24.	"Triumphant Return"	2:18
25.	"Gertrude Ederle's Legacy"	1:33

== Personnel ==
- Music composer: Amelia Warner
- Music producers: Amelia Warner, Lorne Balfe
- Arranger, score co-producer: Sam Thompson
- Music co-ordination: Hilary Skewes
- Recorded at: AIR Lyndhurst Hall, London
- Mixed at: Air-Edel Studios, London
- Studio manager: Alison Burton
- Recording and mix engineer: Nick Taylor
- Assistant engineers: Rebecca Hordern, Jedidiah Rimell
- Supervising music editor: Timeri Duplat
- Music editor: Al Green
- Temp music editors: Yann McCullough, Allegra DeSouza
- Pro-tools recordist: Jack Mills
- Pro-tools operator: Olly Thompson
- Technical assistants: Alastair McNamara, Cora Miron, Anna Stokes
- Orchestrator: Anthony Weeden
- Assistant orchestrators: Sam Jones, Jonathan Weeden, Stuart Macrae, Jon Sims
- Conductor: Robert Ziegler
- Copyist: Colin Rae
- Additional orchestra contractor: Sophie Procter
- Orchestra leader: Jonathan Morton
- Solo cello: Ashok Klouda
- Electric cello: Peter Gregson
- Solo piano: Tom Poster
- Choir: Tenebrae Choir
- Choirmaster: Nigel Short
