= List of successful English Channel swimmers =

This is a list of notable successful swims across the English Channel, a straight-line distance of at least 33.7 kilometres (20.9 mi; 18.2 nmi).

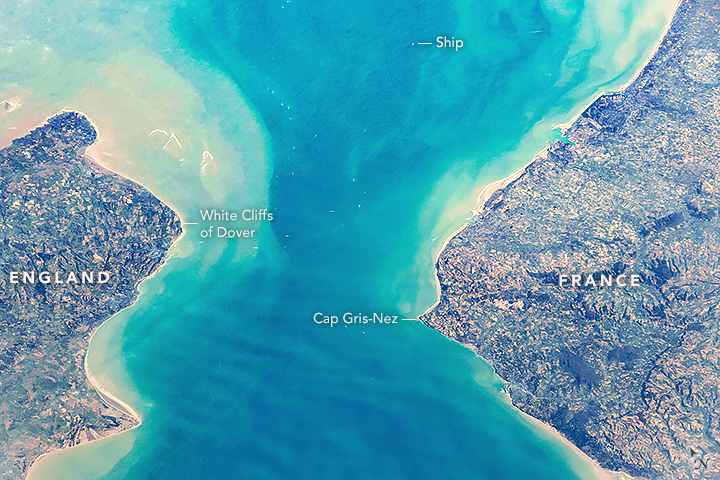
Aerial view of the Strait of Dover

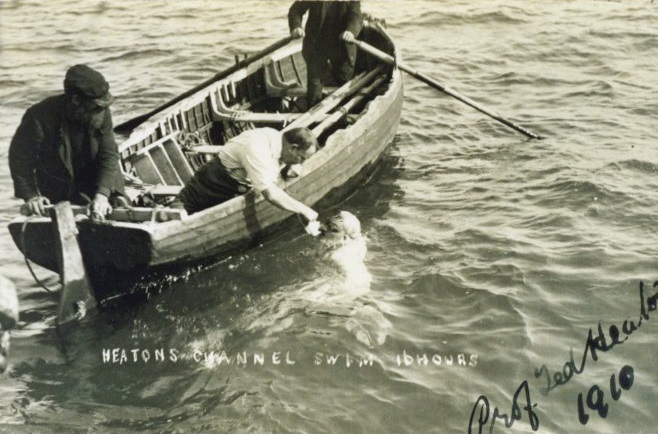
Ted Heaton (in water) being fed by assistants during his 1910 swim

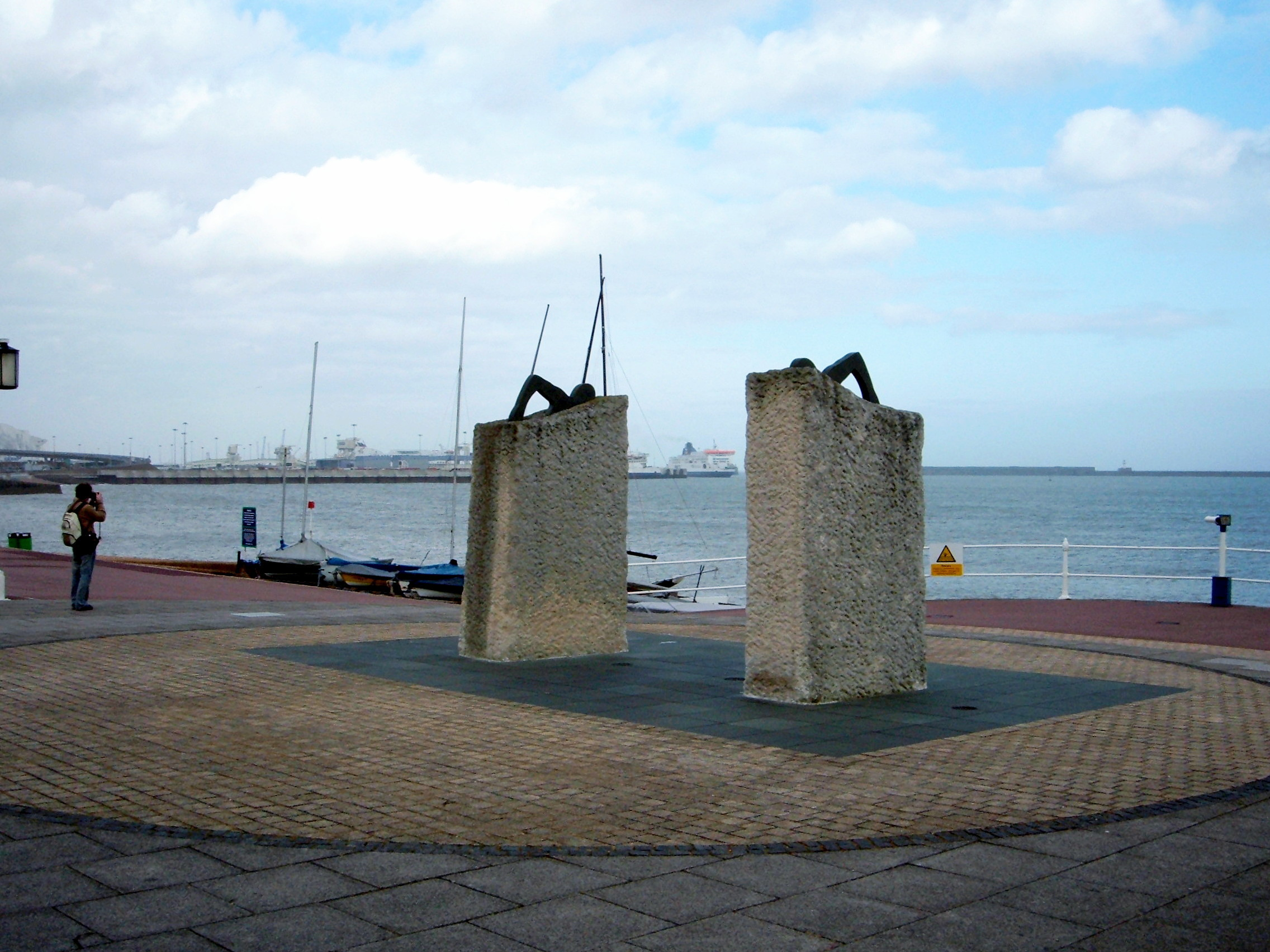
Monument in Dover to Channel swimmers

== First attempts ==
=== First unaided attempt, by J. B. Johnson ===
The first attempt to cross the channel with no artificial aid was made by the 23-year-old J. B. Johnson on 30 August 1872. Johnson hired a brass band in Dover to promote his attempt and entertained the crowd for three hours at Dover before diving in and starting his swim.

Johnson swam for 45 minutes before having a quick break to down some brandy. He then continued until he had swum for 1 hour before having another break to drink more brandy. After 1 hour and 20 minutes, Johnson boarded the boat because the cold water was too much for him to manage. Despite this, the boat continued on to Calais, where Johnson jumped off the boat and swam to shore. The crowd waiting for him believed Johnson had swum the channel, and Johnson briefly entertained this idea. However, later he said that he never intended to swim the whole channel, and that it was all a stunt for publicity.

=== First successful crossing, by Paul Boyton ===
The first successful attempt was by Paul Boyton, wearing a rubber survival suit designed for passengers of sinking ships. On 28 May 1875, on his second attempt, he entered the water at Cap Gris-Nez at 03:00, accompanied by the Prince Ernest and captained by Edward Dane. By 06:00, Boyton was 5 miles from the French coast, and at 11:45, he was halfway. At 18:30, Boyton was 4 miles from Dover, and by 02:30, he had landed at Fan Bay, near the Port of Dover. He completed the swim in around 23 1/2 hours. The press began to portray him as a rival of endurance swimmer Matthew Webb.

=== First unaided successful crossing, by Matthew Webb ===
Matthew Webb made the crossing without the aid of artificial buoyancy. His first attempt ended in failure, but on 25 August 1875, he started from Admiralty Pier in Dover and made the crossing in 21 hours and 45 minutes, despite challenging tides (which delayed him for 5 hours) and a jellyfish sting.

=== Second unaided successful crossing, by Thomas Burgess ===
80 failed attempts were made by a variety of people before Thomas William Burgess, on 6 September 1911, became the second person to make the crossing without artificial buoyancy. He crossed from Dover to Cap Gris Nez in 22 hours and 35 minutes at his 16th bid. Burgess ate a hearty meal of ham and eggs before starting his swim. He had trained for only 18 hours beforehand, and his longest practice swim was only 10 kilometres (6 mi).

=== Other early crossings ===
Henry Sullivan was successful at his seventh attempt, becoming the third person, and the first American, to make the crossing. He entered the water in Dover at 16:20 on Sunday, 5 August 1923. Choppy waters and capricious tides forced him to swim an estimated 90 kilometres (56 mi). He reached shore at Calais at 20:05 on 6 August, finishing in 27 hours and 45 minutes. Two other swimmers completed the swim that same summer. Enrique Tirabocchi, from Argentina, completed the swim on 13 August, finishing in a record time of 16 hours and 33 minutes and the first person to swim the route starting from France. American Charles Toth of Boston completed the swim on 9 September 1923, in 16 hours and 40 minutes, two days after the expiration of a £1,000 prize offered by the Daily Sketch for anyone who completed the swim, a prize that both Sullivan and Tirabocchi received from a representative of the Daily Sketch waiting on the shore with a cheque in hand.

=== First crossings by women ===
American Gertrude Ederle's successful cross-channel swim began at Gris Nez in France at 07:05 on 6 August 1926. Her trainer was Burgess. She came ashore at Kingsdown, Kent, England, in a total time of 14 hours and 39 minutes, making her the first woman to complete the crossing and setting the record for the fastest time, breaking the previous mark set by Tirabocchi by almost two hours. A reporter from The New York Times, who had accompanied Ederle's support team on a tugboat, recounted that Ederle was confronted by a British immigration official, who recorded the biographical details of Ederle and the individuals on board the ship, none of whom had been carrying their passports. Ederle was finally allowed to come ashore, after promising that she would report to the authorities the following morning.

L. Walter Lissberger financed the $3,000 in expenses that Amelia Gade Corson and her husband incurred in preparing for the Channel swim. Lissberger made a wager with Lloyd's of London betting that she would succeed in crossing the Channel, and received a payout of $100,000 at odds of 20:1 when she completed her swim. She was one of three swimmers who were trying to make the swim across the Channel at the same time, starting at 23:32 on 28 August 1926, leaving from Cape Gris Nez. The two men with her failed; Egyptian swimmer Ishak Helmy dropped out after three hours, and an English swimmer failed 1.6 kilometres (1 mi) from Dover's Shakespeare Cliffs. With her husband rowing alongside in a dory and providing her with hot chocolate, sugar lumps and crackers, she completed the swim in a time of 15 hours and 29 minutes, one hour longer than the record set by Gertrude Ederle three weeks earlier.

Jackie Cobell had intended to make the crossing by a more direct route in July 2010, but she inadvertently set the record for the slowest solo swim, when strong currents forced her to swim a total of 105 kilometres (65 mi) in 28 hours and 44 minutes.

== First swims ==
Direction	Country of origin	Swimmer	Year	Time	Notes
England to France	United Kingdom	Matthew Webb	1875	21:45	First ever unaided crossing; swam from England to France on 25 August 1875.
England to France	United Kingdom	Bill Burgess	1911	22:35	Second crossing from England to France on 6 September 1911.
England to France	United States	Henry Sullivan	1923	26:50	Third crossing from England to France; first American to swim across the English Channel.
France to England	Italy; Argentina	Enrique Tirabocchi	1923	16:33	First crossing from France to England. First Italian/Argentine.
France to England	United States	Charles Toth	1923	16:54	Fifth crossing.
France to England	United States	Gertrude Ederle	1926	14:39	First woman to cross in either direction.
France to England	Denmark	Amelia Gade Corson	1926	15:32	Second woman and first mother.
France to England	Germany	Ernst Vierkötter	1926	12:40	Eighth crossing.
France to England and England to France	United Kingdom	Edward H. Temme	1934	15:34	Ninth and first man to swim the English Channel in both directions. He swam from France to England in August 1927 and from England to France on 18 August 1934.

== National firsts ==
Direction	Country of origin	Swimmer	Year	Time	Notes
England to France	United Kingdom	Matthew Webb	1875	21:45	First British person and man to swim the English Channel.
England to France	United States	Henry Sullivan	1923	26:50	First American person and man to swim the English Channel.
France to England	United States	Gertrude Ederle	1926	14:39	First American woman to swim the English Channel.
England to France	France	Georges Michel	1926	11:05	First French person and man to swim the English Channel.
France to England	United Kingdom	Mercedes Gleitze	1927	15:15	First British woman to swim the English Channel.
France to England	South Africa	Margaret ('Peggy') Duncan	1930	16:17	First known person from Southern Africa to swim the English Channel.
France to England	Sweden	Sally Bauer	1939	15:22	First Swede, and first Scandinavian, to swim the English Channel.
England to France	Belgium	Fernand Du Moulin	1949	12:59	First Belgian person and man to swim the English Channel.
France to England	Canada	Winnie Leuszler	1951	13:25	First Canadian to swim the English Channel.
England to France	Netherlands	Jan van Hemsbergen	1951	14:03	First Dutch person and man to swim the English Channel.
France to England	United Kingdom	Jenny James	1951	13:55	First Welsh person to swim the English Channel.
England to France	Mexico	Damian Pizá Beltran	1953	15:23	First Mexican to swim the English Channel.
England to France	Syria	Mohamed El Soussi	1954	17:55	First Syrian person and man to swim the English Channel.
France to England	Canada	Jacques Amyot	1956	13:02	First Canadian man to swim the English Channel.
France to England	Bangladesh	Brojen Das	1958	10:35	First Asian (from Bikrampur, East Pakistan; now Bangladesh) to swim the English Channel, at the English Channel Swimming Competition in 1958. Das became a Bangladeshi citizen after the Bangladesh Liberation War in 1971.
England to France	India	Mihir Sen	1958	14:45	First Indian to swim the English Channel.
France to England	Brazil	Abilio Couto	1958	12:45	First South American to swim the English Channel.
France to England	Southern Rhodesia	Dennis Pearson	1959	15:36	The second known person, and first man, from Southern Africa to swim the Channel. Pearson, from Salisbury, Southern Rhodesia, swam across on Bastille Day, 14 July 1959.
France to England	India	Arati Saha	1959	14:20	First Indian woman and first Asian woman to swim the English Channel.
France to England	North Macedonia	Niko Nestor	1959	12:06	First Macedonian to swim the English Channel.
France to England	Netherlands	Mary Kok	1960	24:25	First Dutch woman to swim the English Channel.
England to France	South Africa	Peter Bales	1969	13:38	Second person, and first man, from South Africa to swim the English Channel. He was the third person from Southern Africa to complete the swim.
France to England	Socialist Republic of Macedonia	Atina Bojadži	1969	13:20	First Macedonian woman to swim the English Channel.
France to England	United Kingdom	Ray Cossum	1970	13:41	First Irishman to swim the English Channel. (Cossum was born in Kent and moved to Derry, Northern Ireland as a teenager.) He worked as a saturation diver and claimed to be the only person to have crossed the Channel by train, boat, submarine, plane and swimming, and to have worked at its bottom.
France to England	Czechoslovakia	František Venclovský	1971	15:26	First Czech (Czechoslovak at that time) to swim the channel.
England to France	Poland	Teresa Zarzeczańska	1975	11:10	First Polish person to swim the English Channel.
England to France	Poland	Romuald Szopa	1978	12:49	First Polish man to swim the English Channel.
England to France	United Kingdom	Mary Yeats	1979	11:19	First Scot to swim the English Channel.
England to France	Belgium	Vera Zeitzen	1981	10:27	First Belgian woman to swim the English Channel.
England to France	Israel	Eitan Friedman	1993	13:13	First Israeli to swim the English Channel.
England to France	Tunisia	Nejib Belhedi	1993	16:35	First Tunisian to swim the channel, namesake of a trophy for swimming the channel at the highest tide.
England to France	France	Marion Hans	1994	9:42	First French woman to swim the English Channel.
England to France	Norway	Bharat Shukla	2000	13:52	First Norwegian to swim the English Channel.
England to France	China	Zhang Jian	2001	11:56	First person from China to swim the English Channel.
England to France	Barbados	Chris Gibbs	2003	11:30	First person from a Caribbean country to swim the English Channel. Aged 58, and member of The Merrymen Calypso band.
England to France	Malaysia	Abdul Malik Mydin	2003	17:42	First Malaysian swimmer to cross the English Channel.
England to France	Dominican Republic	Marcos Diaz	2004	09:56	First Dominican swimmer to cross the English Channel.
England to France	Singapore	Thum Ping Tjin	2005	12:24	First Singaporean to swim the Channel.
England to France	Iceland	Sigrún Þuríður Geirsdóttir	2015	22:34	First Icelandic woman to swim the English Channel.
England to France	Luxembourg	Paule Kremer	2017	13:54	First Luxembourgish person and woman to swim the English Channel.
England to France	Israel	Avishag Turek	2017	13:??	First Israeli woman to swim the English Channel.
England to France	Ecuador	Sara Palacios	2018	12:58	First Ecuadorian citizen and South American Woman to swim the channel.
England to France	Syria	Zeina Alsharkas	2019	11:36	First Syrian woman to swim the English Channel.
England to France	Chile	Bárbara Hernández	2019	12:13	First Chilean to swim the English Channel.
England to France	Taiwan	Hsu Wen-erh (許汶而)	2024	12:17	First Taiwanese to swim the English Channel.

== Other notable crossings ==
Direction	Country of origin	Swimmer	Year	Time	Notes
England to France	United States	Florence Chadwick	1953	14:42	First woman to swim the English Channel in both directions (on separate occasions).
England to France	United Kingdom	Bill Pickering	1955	14:06	First vegetarian swimmer to cross the English Channel.
England to France to England	Argentina	Antonio Abertondo	1961	43:10	First person to swim the channel both ways non-stop.
France to England	United Kingdom	Margaret White	1961	15:08	At the time, the youngest person to swim the Channel (aged 17).
England to France to England	Canada	Cindy Nicholas	1977	19:55	First woman and youngest swimmer (at the time) to swim the channel both ways non-stop, breaking Jon Erikson's record of 30 hours and setting a new world record. Her one way crossing in 1975 set the record of 9 hours and 46 minutes (a record that stood until 1988). She holds the record for the most two-way crossings with a total of five.
England to France	United States	Charles Chapman	1981	12:30	First black swimmer to cross the Channel.
England to France to England to France	United States	Jon Erikson	1981	38:27	First person to swim the channel three ways.
England to France	Australia	John Maclean	1998	12:55	First paraplegic to swim the Channel.
England to France	Bulgaria	Petar Stoychev	2007	6:57	First swimmer to cross the English Channel under 7 hours.
England to France	France	Philippe Croizon	2010	13:28	First quadruple amputee to swim the English Channel.
England to France to England to France to England	United States	Sarah Thomas	2019	54:10	First person to swim the channel four ways non-stop.
England to France	United Kingdom	Gillian Castle	2023	13:53	First person with a stoma to swim the Channel.
England to France	United Kingdom	George Bromley	2024	68:10	First person to swim the channel from Portsmouth to Caen, following the D-Day landing route.
England to France	Australia	Eva Buzo	2024	10:49	Earliest crossing in the season by a woman (June).

== Records ==
=== Fastest ===
Record	Country of origin	Swimmer	Time	Date
Men	Germany	Andreas Waschburger	06:45	Sep. 2023
Women	Czech Republic	Yvetta Hlaváčová	07:25	2006
Men two ways	New Zealand	Philip Rush	16:10	1987
Women two ways	Australia	Susie Maroney	17:14	1991
Men three ways	New Zealand	Philip Rush	28:21	1987
Women three ways	United Kingdom	Alison Streeter	34:40	1990
Four ways	United States	Sarah Thomas	54:10	2019

=== Most crossings ===
Record	Country of origin	Swimmer	Crossings
Women	Australia	Chloë McCardel	45
Men	United Kingdom	Kevin Murphy	34
Women two ways	Canada	Cynthia Nicholas	5
Men two ways	United Kingdom	Kevin Murphy	3
Men two ways	Australia	Stuart Johnson	3
Women three ways	United Kingdom	Alison Streeter	1
Women three ways	Australia	Chloe McCardel	1
Women three ways	United States	Sarah Thomas	1
Men three ways	United States	Jon Erikson	1
Men three ways	New Zealand	Philip Rush	1
Four ways	United States	Sarah Thomas	1

=== Oldest swimmer ===
Record	Country of origin	Swimmer	Age	Date	Reference
Women	United Kingdom	Linda Ashmore	71 years	August 21, 2018	
Men	South Africa	Otto Thaning	73 years	September 6, 2014	

=== Youngest swimmer ===
Record	Country of origin	Swimmer	Age	Date	Reference
Women	United Kingdom	Samantha Druce	12 years, 118 days	1983	
Men	United Kingdom	Thomas Gregory	11 years, 330 days	1988	

=== Relay ===
Record	Country of origin	Swimmers	Time	Date	Reference
2 swimmers	United Kingdom	Max Ashken, Nick Skelton	8:55	2026	
3 swimmers	United KingdomUSA	Alex Burrell, Christopher Brook, Kevin Mitchell	9:39	2011	
4 swimmers	Brazil		8:22	2011	

== Sources ==
- Watson, Kathy (2001). The crossing: the glorious tragedy of the first man to swim the English channel. New York: G. P. Putnam's Sons. ISBN 1-58542-109-X.
- Dolphin (1875). The Channel Feats of Captain Webb and Captain Boyton. London: Dean & Son.
