= Amelia Gade Corson =

American swimmer (1897–1982)

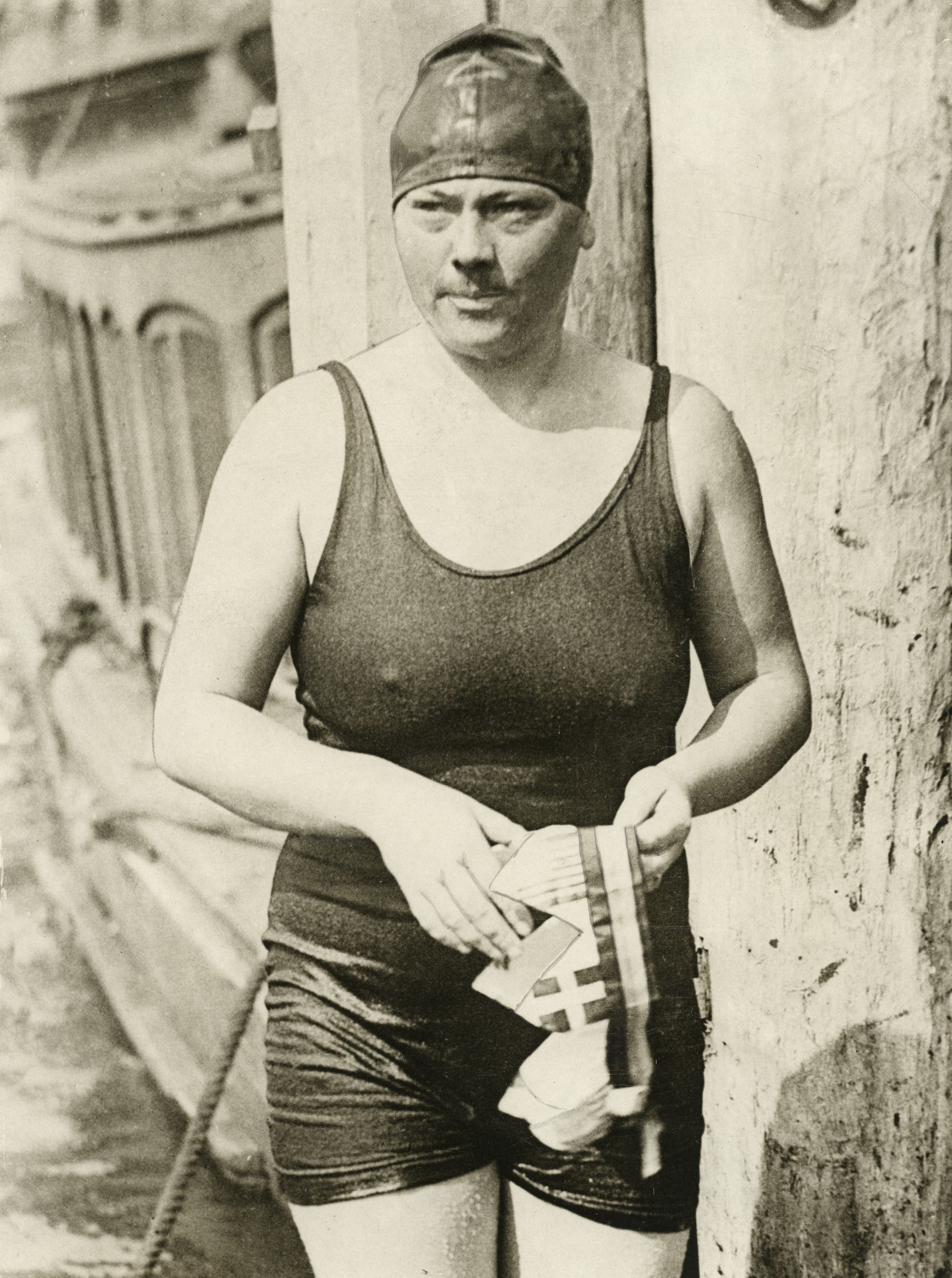

Personal information
- Born: February 11, 1897 Copenhagen, Denmark
- Died: May 1, 1982 (aged 85) Croton-on-Hudson, New York, United States

Sport
- Sport: Swimming
- Strokes: Long-distance swimming

Amelia "Mille" Gade Corson (February 11, 1897 – May 1, 1982) was a Danish-born American long-distance swimmer who is best known as becoming the seventh person, third American and second woman to successfully swim across the English Channel. Earlier, Corson had completed the swim around Manhattan Island, a distance of 42 miles, and had also completed the swim from Albany, New York, to New York City, swimming the distance in a total of 5 days, 3 hours and 11.5 minutes. The straight-line distance between the two points is 143 miles, but Corson swam an extra 10 miles due to various detours.

== Early life and career ==
Amelia Gade was Born in Copenhagen, Denmark, in 1897. She was raised in Vejle, and learned to swim at six years old. Her father wanted her to become a musician or prima donna, and she moved to Cophenhagen to study music. However, she preferred swimming and later moved back to Vejle to start a swim school. She was awarded a gold medal by the King of Denmark for saving two people from drowning.

Gade sailed to the United States in 1919. Her first job was as a swimming assistant in New York City, and then she spent three years as the head swim teacher in the Harlem YWCA for three years.

In June 1921, Gade approached the USS Illinois superintendent for advice on becoming the second woman to swim the 42 miles around Manhattan Island. His assistant, Clemington Corson, helped Gade find maps and rowed with her during the swim. Gade swam 42 miles around Manhattan Island in 15 hours and 57 minutes, and the swim was reported by The New York Times.

In September, Gade swam 153 miles over 5 days, 3 hours and 11.5 minutes from Albany to New York City. Gade was again supported by Clemington Corson in a rowing boat. Gade married Corson two weeks later and they had two children: Clemington Jr. and Margaret.

Gade became a swimming instructor on the USS Illinois for three years. In July 1922, she swam 22 miles from Dover to Ramsgate in 6 hours and 20 minutes. Her time was six minutes off the record set by Frank Perks.

Gade received the Carnegie medal for saving a life.

== Channel swim ==
In August 1925, Several newspapers reported on Gade's intention to swim the channel the following year, and highlighted that she was a mother.

In preparation, Gade implemented a daily exercise plan that she had received from racewalking champion Louis Leibgold, the physical director of the Illinois. Leibgold introduced Corson to L. Walter Lissberger—Chairman of the board of directors at the Malcolm Tyre Company, who gave her $3,000 to finance the trip and bet $5,000 at odds of 20-to-1 on her completing the crossing. She also received expert advice on the Channel's conditions, but none on her swimming stroke.

In 1923 she failed her first attempt to swim across the English Channel. She was two miles from France before the tide carried her seven miles away from shore. She swam the first 21 miles in 14.5 hours.

In Spring 1926, she swam eight miles along the Harlem River from Spuyten Duyvil to Hell Gate in one hour and fifty minutes.

Around the time of her swim, Gade weighed 158 pounds (~72 kg) and was five feet and five inches tall.

On August 6, 1926, Gertrude Ederle became the first woman to swim the English Channel, however, she was criticized for having a boat near her throughout the swim. So, Gade kept her supporting boat 20–70 yards away at all times, while Clemington rowed next to her in a dory.

On the night of August 28, at 11:32 at night (23:32 UTC), Gade began her second Channel attempt from Cap Gris-Nez, France. She made good progress, and at around halfway, she was on pace to beat Ederle's record. Throughout the swim she consumed two pints of hot chocolate, four sugar cubes and some crackers. In the second half of the swim, the wind and tide slowed her, but her friends encouraged her, and she finished at Shakespeare Cliff, Dover, with a time of 15 hours and 32 minutes. Upon finishing the swim on August 29, 1926, she was welcomed by hundreds of people and went to the local bath house. The New York Times and several Danish newspapers reported on the swim.

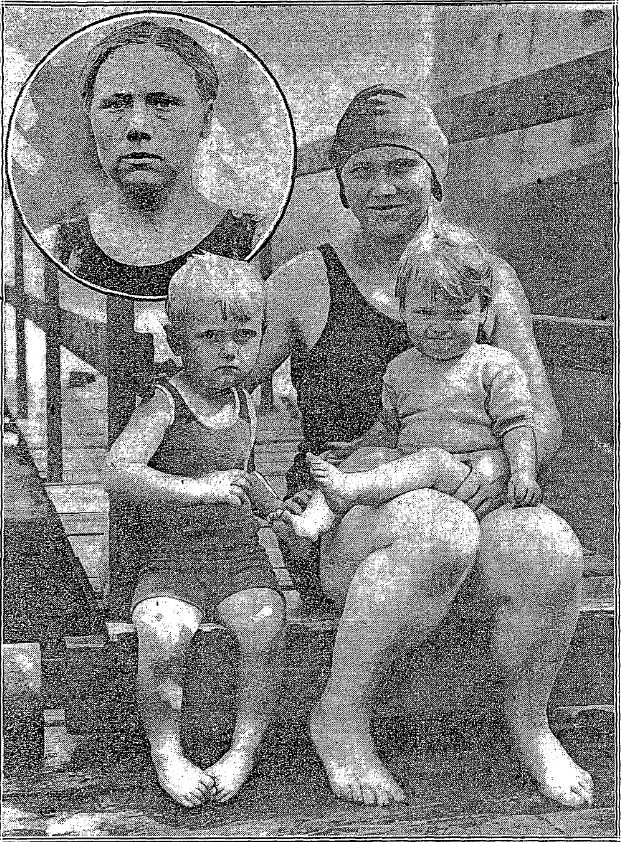
Amelia Gade Corson and her children in the New York Times newspaper shortly after her swim

Gade sailed to New York City aboard the RMS Aquitania, and was welcomed by a ticker-tape parade.

Gade was the first mother and second woman to swim the Channel.

== Death ==
Corson died in Croton on Hudson, New York, on May 26, 1982.

== Sources ==
- Mortimer, Gavin (February 19, 2008). The Great Swim. New York: Walker Publishing. ISBN 978-1-906021-29-0.
