= Young Woman and the Sea =

2024 biographical sports drama film by Joachim Rønning

- Theatrical release poster
- Directed by: Joachim Rønning
- Written by: Jeff Nathanson
- Based on: Young Woman and the Sea by Glenn Stout
- Produced by: Jerry Bruckheimer; Chad Oman; Jeff Nathanson
- Starring: Daisy Ridley; Tilda Cobham-Hervey; Stephen Graham; Kim Bodnia; Jeanette Hain; Christopher Eccleston; Glenn Fleshler
- Cinematography: Oscar Faura
- Edited by: Úna Ní Dhonghaíle
- Music by: Amelia Warner
- Production companies: Walt Disney Pictures; Jerry Bruckheimer Films
- Distributed by: Walt Disney Studios Motion Pictures
- Release dates: May 16, 2024 (Los Angeles); May 31, 2024 (United States)
- Running time: 129 minutes
- Country: United States
- Language: English
- Budget: $40 million
- Box office: $1.9 million

Young Woman and the Sea is a 2024 American biographical sports drama film directed by Joachim Rønning and written by Jeff Nathanson, based on the 2009 book by Glenn Stout. Produced by Walt Disney Pictures and Jerry Bruckheimer Films, the film stars Daisy Ridley as Gertrude Ederle, an American competitive swimmer who became the first woman to swim across the English Channel. It also stars Tilda Cobham-Hervey, Stephen Graham, Kim Bodnia, Christopher Eccleston, and Glenn Fleshler in supporting roles.

Development on the film began in 2015 after producer Jerry Bruckheimer acquired the film rights to the book, and established a distribution deal with Paramount Pictures, with Nathanson attached to write it and Lily James cast as Ederle. Paramount eventually put the project in turnaround. In 2020, Walt Disney Pictures acquired the project with Ridley set to portray Ederle and Rønning to direct it. Principal photography took place between May and June 2022.

Young Woman and the Sea premiered at the Hollywood Roosevelt Hotel in Los Angeles on May 16, 2024. Originally set for release by Disney on its streaming service Disney+, the film had a limited theatrical release after positive test screenings in the United States on May 31, 2024. It received positive reviews from critics.

== Plot ==
In New York City, 1914, a young Trudy Ederle, who is afflicted with measles, witnesses a burning ferry capsize, with that disaster leaving hundreds of the passengers dead. Her mother, Gertrude, is horrified by the incident. After learning that most of the dead were women due to their inability to swim, she resolves to have Trudy's siblings, Meg and Henry Jr., learn swimming for their survival, with Trudy barred from water due to her illness. Surprisingly, Trudy recovers from measles. She becomes fascinated with swimming, and having persuaded her stern father, Henry, to allow her, she begins to pursue the sport when she's 12. Subsequently, Gertrude has them join the Women's Swimming Association under the tutelage of the headstrong Charlotte Epstein. Trudy is initially passed over for Meg, whom Epstein favors. Nevertheless, she agrees also to train Trudy, who makes quick progress. Over time, Trudy's performance keeps improving and she wins a string of world records; however, Meg's advance is far more modest.

In 1924, the Ederles are approached by the American Olympic Union (AOU) about participating in the 1924 Paris Olympics; however, only Trudy is offered a spot. Subsequently, the U.S. women's team is introduced to Jabez Wolffe, a swimmer who unsuccessfully attempted to cross the English Channel, as their coach. However, the sexist Wolffe prevents them from properly training, and as a consequence, Trudy only wins bronze medals in the 100 metre freestyle and 400 metre freestyle. She returns to New York in disappointment, which worsens when she discovers that in her absence, Meg has become engaged to be married in a deal orchestrated by their father.

After an encounter with Bill Burgess, the second swimmer to have successfully crossed the Channel, a re-motivated Trudy decides to attempt the feat herself. Enlisting Epstein's help, she approaches James Sullivan of the AOU to sponsor the attempt. Sullivan, an opponent of female athletics, dismisses the idea but offers to sponsor it conditionally, provided that Trudy swims from New York to New Jersey within a three-hour deadline. Trudy easily beats the deadline and earns the sponsorship, but she is forced to pair with Wolffe as her coach.

In France, Trudy trains at the Cap Gris-Nez, where she befriends Benji, another swimmer attempting to cross the 21-mile (34 km) Channel; there, she clashes repeatedly with Wolffe, who attempts to control her training. After a near-disastrous attempt by Benji, Trudy embarks on her maiden attempt on July 20, 1926. With Wolffe directing her, Trudy initially does well. However, the former, having grown jealous of the latter's progress, ostensibly spikes her tea, which disorients her and brings the attempt to an end. (Note: The film implies that Wolffe may have possibly, not confirmedly poisoned Ederle; it does not explicitly show Wolffe spiking Trudy's drink. Although the real-life Wolffe and Trudy disliked each other, there is no historical evidence to confirm that version of events.) Whilst recovering, Trudy is visited by Henry and Meg, who have come to take her home; however, they are stopped by Burgess, who offers to train her, having deduced Wolffe's duplicity.

Determined, Trudy secretly escapes from her return trip home and begins preparations for another attempt, making Burgess promise not to save her should she fail again. Meanwhile, Sullivan discovers Trudy's deception; realizing she will attempt again, he notifies the press. On August 6, 1926, Trudy begins the second attempt, this time with Burgess, Henry and Meg as her guiding team. With the press in tow, the attempt's developments are monitored worldwide. Despite enduring jellyfish stings, Trudy persists in her attempt before facing the final challenge: to cross the Goodwin Sands in order to reach England. With her guide boat unable to follow her into the shallow waters, she decides to swim alone rather than accept defeat. By nighttime, her team arrives at Dover, but while swimming in open water, Trudy loses her direction. However, the townspeople set up bonfires on the beaches as a guiding beacon for her. News of her success spreads, and upon her return to New York, Trudy is given a ticker-tape parade through the city, which she shares with her family and Epstein, crediting them for her success.

The intertitles before the film's closing credits inform that Trudy set the world record for crossing the Channel at 14 hours and 31 minutes, beating the world record held by a man by two hours. She eventually lost her hearing and dedicated her life to teaching deaf children to swim; she died in 2003 at the age of 98.

== Cast ==
- Daisy Ridley as Gertrude "Trudy" Ederle: An American competition swimmer and Olympic champion.
  - Olive Abercrombie as Young Trudy Ederle
- Christopher Eccleston as Jabez Wolffe: Trudy's trainer in France who failed to swim the English Channel on multiple attempts.
- Stephen Graham as Bill Burgess: Her hero who successfully swam the English Channel and inspires her.
- Tilda Cobham-Hervey as Margaret "Meg" Ederle: Trudy's sister.
  - Lilly Aspell as Young Meg.
- Kim Bodnia as Henry Ederle: Trudy's father.
- Jeanette Hain as Gertrude Anna Ederle: Trudy's mother.
- Glenn Fleshler as James Sullivan: the man that sponsors the women swimmers to the 1924 Paris Olympics and who Trudy attempts to convince to fund her attempt to cross the English Channel.
- Sian Clifford as Charlotte Epstein: Trudy's swimming trainer at the Women's Swimming Association (WSA) in America.
- Alexander Karim as Benji Zammit: a fictional swimmer who befriends Gertrude Ederle.

== Production ==
=== Development ===
In November 2015, it was announced that Jerry Bruckheimer had acquired the rights to the 2009 non-fiction book Young Woman and the Sea: How Trudy Ederle Conquered the English Channel and Inspired the World by Glenn Stout for Paramount Pictures, hiring Jeff Nathanson to write the script for the film, and Lily James cast to play Gertrude Ederle. In December 2020, it was reported that the film was in development at Walt Disney Pictures, with the company eyeing a Disney+ release, after Paramount put it in turnaround. Production was overseen by Jerry Bruckheimer under his Jerry Bruckheimer Films banner, and Chad Oman for Disney.

According to its closing credits, the film was produced with support of British Film Commission and UK Government's Film Tax Relief; it benefitted from France's Tax Rebate for International Production; and was created with support of Bulgaria's Executive Agency National Film Center and with participation of Canada's Film or Video Production Services Tax Credit in Quebec.

=== Casting ===
Lily James was originally cast in the role of Gertrude Ederle, while the film was in development hell. With the film's announcement in December 2020, Daisy Ridley was cast in that role instead. In March 2022, Tilda Cobham-Hervey joined the cast of the film playing Margaret Ederle, along with Stephen Graham in an undisclosed role. In May 2022, Christopher Eccleston joined the cast in an undisclosed role.

=== Filming ===
Principal photography began by early May 2022, and wrapped on June 18, 2022. Ridley received swimming training from Olympic swimmer turned coach Siobhan-Marie O'Connor.

=== Music ===
The score for Young Woman and the Sea was composed by Amelia Warner, and was produced by Warner and Lorne Balfe. It was recorded over eight days at AIR Studios, London. The album was released digitally on May 31, 2024, through Walt Disney Records.

== Release ==
The film's world premiere took place on May 16, 2024, in Los Angeles.

Young Woman and the Sea was originally scheduled to be released direct-to-streaming on Disney+. In January 2024, following positive test screenings and the box office performance of the Amazon MGM Studios sports drama The Boys in the Boat (2023), a theatrical release was considered as a possible way to tie in with the upcoming 2024 Summer Olympics in France, with a potential release date of May 31, 2024. The following month, that date was confirmed, with Disney opting for a limited release for the film in the United States. During the theatrical run, it was only shown in the USA, the United Kingdom, and China. It was later released on Disney+ worldwide on July 19, 2024.

=== Marketing ===
First look images from the film were released exclusively by People on March 6, 2024. The trailer debuted at CinemaCon on April 11, 2024, and was released to the public online shortly after.

== Reception ==
=== Box office ===
Young Woman and the Sea grossed $500,000 in the United States, and $1.43 million internationally (with $81,725 coming from the United Kingdom and $1,349,860 from China) for a worldwide total of $1.9 million.

=== Critical response ===
On the review aggregator website Rotten Tomatoes, 88% of 113 critics' reviews are positive, with an average rating of 6.9/10. The website's consensus reads: "Buoyed by Daisy Ridley's radiant star power and the remarkable trajectory of Gertrude Ederle's life story, Young Woman and the Sea is an old-fashioned sports movie that harkens back to the classics in the best way." Metacritic, which uses a weighted average, assigned the film a score of 62 out of 100, based on 26 critics, indicating "generally favorable" reviews.

Glenn Kenny of The New York Times gave a positive review of the film, writing that "this is one of those movies that proves, when they've got a mind to, they can still make them like they used to." Kate Erbland of IndieWire wrote that "the real Ederle accomplished so much, it's hard to imagine cramming it all into one tidy feature. The one we've got? It's good enough, rousing enough, compelling enough."

Charles Bramesco of The Guardian criticized the film's "anodyne, Disneyfied" take on feminism, writing that "you'd be hard-pressed to find a living person who believes women should not be allowed to go swimming". Derek Smith of Slant Magazine said that the film creates "virtually no dramatic tension" because it "leaves no room for doubt about what Trudy Ederle will accomplish".

Filmmakers J. J. Abrams and William Goldenberg both cited it as among their favorite films of 2024.

=== Accolades ===
Award	Date of ceremony	Category	Recipient(s)	Result	Ref.
International Film Music Critics Association	February 27, 2025	Best Original Score for a Drama Film	Amelia Warner	Nominated	
Movieguide Awards	March 6, 2025	Best Movie for Mature Audiences	Young Woman and the Sea	Won	
Satellite Awards	January 26, 2025	Best Motion Picture – Drama	Young Woman and the Sea	Nominated	
Visual Effects Society	February 11, 2025	Outstanding Supporting Visual Effects in a Photoreal Feature	Richard Briscoe, Stéphane Dittoo, Ivo Jivkov, Carrie Rishel, and Jeremy Robert	Nominated	
World Soundtrack Awards	October 17, 2024	Public Choice Award	Amelia Warner	Nominated	
