= Enrique Tirabocchi =

Argentine swimmer

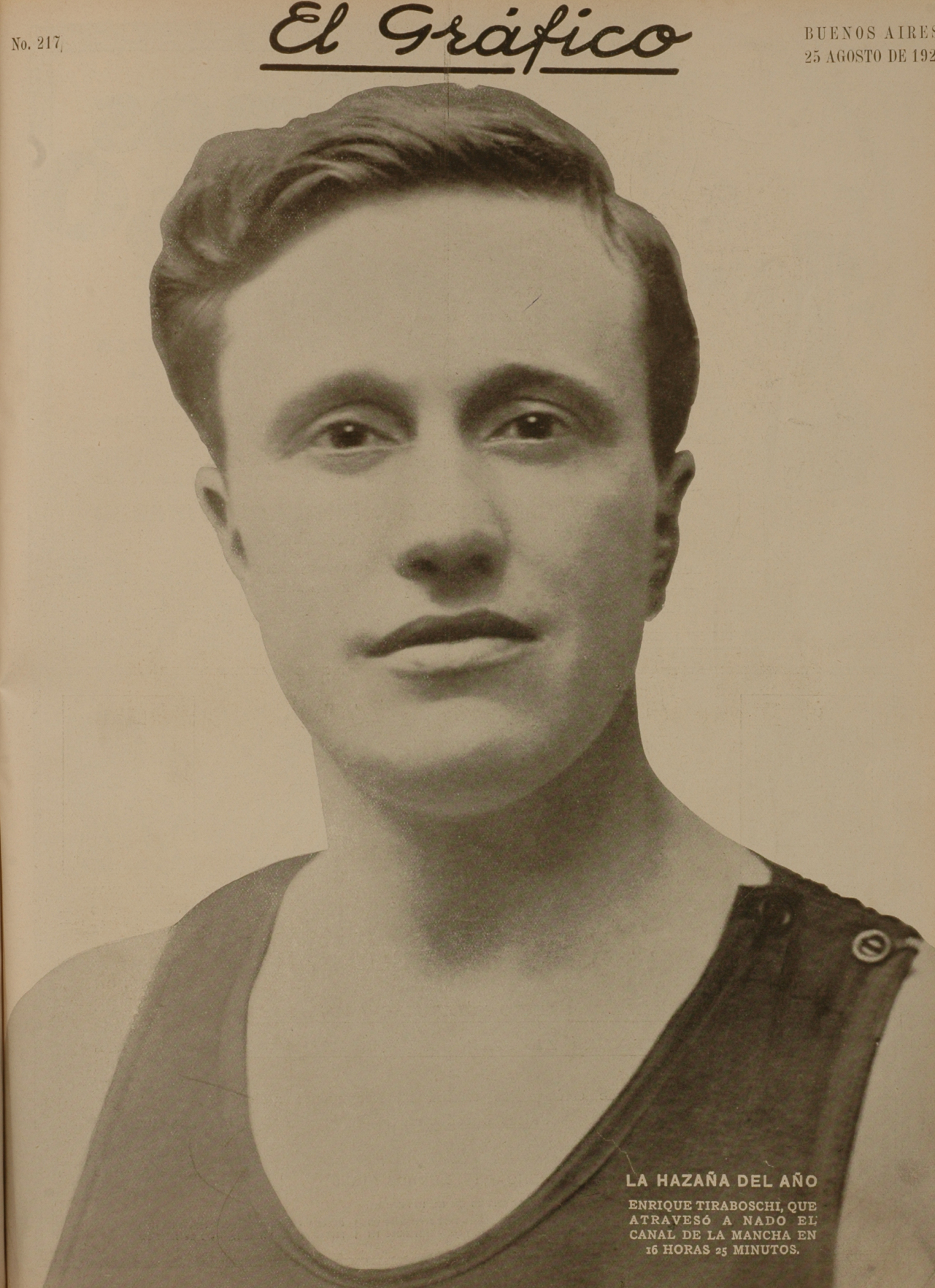

Personal information
- Born: 1887 Trescore Balneario, Italy
- Died: February 7, 1948 (aged 60–61)

Sport
- Sport: Swimming

Enrique Tirabocchi (2 Feb 1886 – February 7, 1948; also spelled as Enrico Tiraboschi) was an Argentine marathon swimmer who in August 1923 became the fourth person to successfully swim across the English Channel. He was the first person to swim from France to England and finished the swim in 16 hours and 33 minutes, beating the record set by Matthew Webb when he was the first to make the crossing almost 50 years earlier.

He was born in Italy in Trescore Balneario, a small town near Bergamo.

== Career ==
In a February 1920 attempt to swim from Colonia, Uruguay across the River Plate to Buenos Aires, Tirabocchi set a record by being in the water for 24 hours and 2 minutes, breaking the record set by Thomas William Burgess in his 1911 Channel swim of 22 hours and 35 minutes. He had made it within 3 miles of finishing the 32 mile distance. Tirabocchi had made an unsuccessful attempt to cross the English Channel on August 29, 1922, but was forced out of the water due to exhaustion after 19.5 hours, having it made it within two miles of St. Margaret's Bay.

=== Successfully crossing the English Channel ===
Tirabocchi entered the water at Cape Gris Nez on the French side of the Channel at 8:00 on the evening of August 11, 1923, telling the assembled crowd that "I'm going to follow [Henry] Sullivan's example" and started out in an ebb tide that lasted an hour. Through the night he went with the flood tide. He was accompanied by thirty friends who followed him on his route, taking turns swimming with him in the water and lighting the way for him with an acetylene lamp at night. He drank some coffee in the morning, but the only food he ate on the trip was an occasional sugar cube.

The pattern of the tides shifted in Tirabocchi's favor, and he was able to enter the cove between Shakespeare Cliff and the Admiralty Pier at the Port of Dover a half-hour before the tides would have turned against him, and would have sent him further away from England as the tide would have carried him in the opposite direction. Tirabocchi reached the English shore having used up almost all of his energy and stumbled into the crowd that had come to cheer him on, completing his swim at 12:33 on August 12. His support team arrived in a row boat and changed him into some fresh clothing, described by The New York Times as being "as though they were dressing some little infant." After recuperating a bit from the rigors of the swim, he entered a rowboat that took him to a tugboat and returned to France almost immediately after his arrival in England. He received a check for 1,000 pounds from the Daily Sketch and was awarded a gold medal for his efforts by the Channel Swimming Club. Tirabocchi donated the prize he received from the newspaper to charity, giving the money to the International Swimming Federation.

Tirabocchi's time of 16 hours and 33 minutes cut more than five hours from the previous fastest time, which had been set by Thomas Webb in 1875 when he made the first successful Channel swim, and was more than nine hours faster than the time set by American Henry Sullivan who had made the England-to-France crossing earlier that week. The Times describe Tirabocchi's path as approximating the shape of the letter "N" while the additional tides faced by Sullivan days earlier had forced him in the track of a "W" with an extra stroke.

American Charles Toth had made an attempt to cross the Channel at the same time in the opposite direction, but was forced to abandon his swim after 18 hours and 10 minutes when he had made it as close as 2.5 miles from the shore on the French side. Romeo Maciel of Argentina and Sam Richards of the United States also attempted the swim at the same time as Tirabocchi, but gave up and quit.

After Tirabocchi entered Italy from Switzerland on September 11, 1923, Italian customs officials at Domodossola confiscated a trophy he had been awarded for his Channel swim, saying that he needed to pay import duty on the item. The swimmer insisted that the cup was not an item for sale and successfully appealed to Benito Mussolini to retrieve the award.

Tirabocchi credited American Gertrude Ederle with having made "a marvelous swim" in 1926, when she finished in 14 hours and 39 minutes, cutting almost two full hours off his record time, saying that her pace was not a matter of luck but was part of the "excellent constitution ... [and] great powers of resistance" needed to complete the swim.
