= Henry Sullivan (swimmer) =

American swimmer

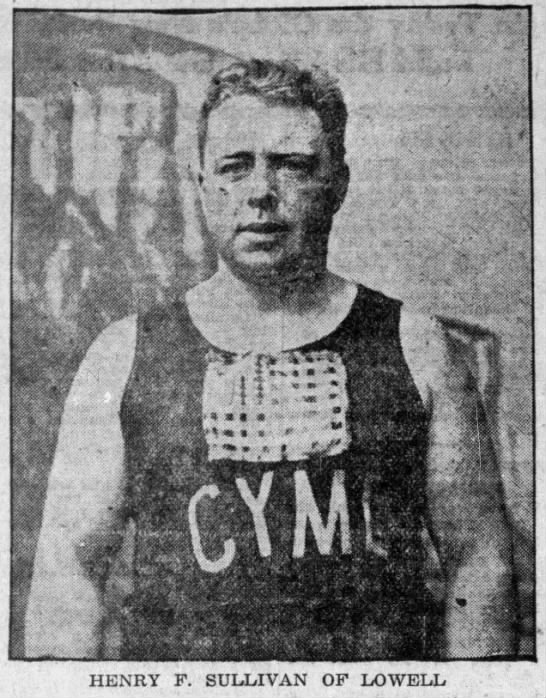
- File:Henry F. Sullivan in The Boston Globe (August 7, 1923)
- Born: March 22, 1892; Lowell, Massachusetts
- Died: December 22, 1955 (aged 63)
- Known for: Being the 3rd person and first American to swim across the English Channel

Henry Francis Sullivan (March 22, 1892 - December 22, 1955) was an American marathon swimmer who is best known for becoming the third person and the first American to swim across the English Channel, beginning his swim on the afternoon of August 5, 1923, from Dover, England, and finishing 26 hours and 50 minutes later on the evening of August 6 at Calais, France.

== Biography ==
The son of Thomas B. Sullivan, a businessman from Lowell, Massachusetts, Henry Francis Sullivan was born on March 22, 1892, in that city. He had been swimming since he was eight years old. He first attempted to make the crossing in 1913, two years after Thomas William Burgess became the second person to successfully complete the swim, but was forced to abandon the attempt a mere 5 miles (8.0 km) from the French side of the Channel. In 1916, Sullivan outswam Charles Toth (a competitive swimmer who would also successfully swim the distance in 1923), setting an American record of continuously swimming for 20 hours and 28 minutes while attempting to swim from Provincetown, Massachusetts, to Nantucket. He made two more attempts at the channel crossing in 1920, his best effort leaving him 1.5 miles (2.4 km) from the French coast before unfavorable tides forced him to give up. In a 1921 attempt, he was forced to quit while within 5 miles (8.0 km) of France after swimming for 19 hours and 5 minutes. Sullivan had sought to make an attempt at the crossing during the 1922 swimming season, but poor weather conditions led him not to make another try.

Sullivan was successful in his seventh attempt, in a calm sea and a water temperature of 62 °F (17 °C). He entered the water in Dover at 4:20 on Sunday afternoon, August 5, and began his swim. Though the straight-line distance is 22.5 miles (36.2 km), choppy waters and capricious tides forced him to swim an estimated 56 miles (90 km). He reached shore at Calais at 8:05 in the evening, was examined by a doctor and had something to eat. He was escorted out to the cheering crowd by Enrique Tirabocchi, an Argentine swimmer who would make the crossing himself later that year.

Two other swimmers completed the swim that same summer. Tirabocchi, from Argentina, completed the swim on August 13, finishing in a record time of 16 hours and 33 minutes and becoming the first person to swim the route starting from the French side of the Channel. American Charles Toth of Boston completed the swim on September 9, 1923, in 16 hours and 40 minutes, missing by two days the expiration of a 1,000 Pound prize offered by the Daily Sketch for anyone who completed the swim, a prize that both Sullivan and Tirabocchi received from a representative of the Daily Sketch waiting on the shore with a check in hand.

Jackie Cobell had intended to make the 21-mile crossing by a more direct route in July 2010, but inadvertently set the record for the slowest solo swim, when strong currents forced her to swim a total of 65 miles (105 km) in 28 hours and 44 minutes, breaking the record set by Sullivan in 1923 for the longest time to make the crossing successfully.

Sullivan died on December 22, 1955, at his home in Beverly, Massachusetts.
