= Glenn Stout =

American writer

Glenn Stout (born 5 September 1958) is an American journalist and writer best known for his 2009 book Young Woman and the Sea, about the first woman to swim the English Channel, Gertrude Ederle. The book was adapted into the 2024 film of the same name, starring Daisy Ridley.

== Career ==
Stout has served as series editor of The Best American Sports Writing, and is the founding editor of The Year's Best Sports Writing. He is the author of Tiger Girl and the Candy Kid, Fenway 1912, Nine Months at Ground Zero.
