= Atina Bojadži =

Yugoslav marathon swimmer of Aromanian Macedonian descent

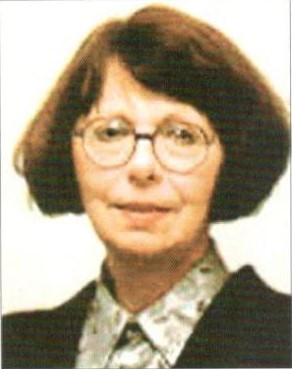
- Born: 13 March 1944; Ohrid, Macedonia
- Died: 28 December 2010 (aged 66); Skopje, then Republic of Macedonia

Atina Bojadži (Macedonian: Атина Бојаџи; 13 March 1944 – 28 December 2010) was a Yugoslav marathon swimmer of Aromanian Macedonian descent. She crossed the English Channel in 1969, being the first woman from Yugoslavia to do so. Nicknamed the "Ohrid Dolphin" after her lakeside hometown, Bojadži won several national and international long-distance swimming races. The achievement inspired a 1977 movie about her life and earned her sporting honors in her native Macedonia after it declared independence in 1991.
