= Philip Rush =

New Zealand swimmer

Philip Rush (New Zealand - born 6 November 1963) is a firefighter and long distance swimmer who is the current world record holder for the fastest two and three way swim of the English Channel which he completed in 1987 in a time of 28 h 21 mins (he completed the two way in a time of 16 h 10 mins (1st leg - 7 h 55 mins, 2nd leg - 8 h 15 mins, 3rd leg - 12 h 11 mins)).

== Biography ==
To date only four other people have completed a three way channel swim. Antonio Abertondo in 1961, Jon Erikson in 1981, Alison Streeter in 1990 and Chloe McCardel in 2015.

Philip also completed a two way swim of the English Channel in 1985 in a time of 17 h 56 mins.

Amongst Philip's other achievement include swimming the English Channel 10 times, the Cook Strait 8 times, including one of only two people to complete a Double Crossing, a feat he achieved on 13 Mar 1984 in a time of 16 h 16 mins and repeated on 9 Feb 1988 in a time of 18 h 37 mins.

Philip also became the first person to complete a double crossing of New Zealand's Lake Taupō (40.2 km) which he completed on 14–15 January 1985. He also holds the time record of 10 h 14 mins set on 10 March 1985.

In June 2000 Philip was invited to take part in carrying the Olympic torch through Wellington, New Zealand.

Philip retired from swimming in 1990 and now coaches, and enjoys preparing swimmers to tackle the Cook Strait.
