= Jon Erikson =

American swimmer (1954–2014)

Personal information
- Born: September 6, 1954 Chicago, Illinois, U.S.
- Died: July 28, 2014 (aged 59) Boca Raton, Florida, U.S.

Sport
- Sport: Swimming

Jon Erikson (September 6, 1954 – July 28, 2014) was an American long distance swimmer who was the first of only five people to have ever completed a three way swim of the English Channel. A physical education teacher at the time, he completed the swim in a time of 38 h 27 mins in 1981.
(1st leg – 10 h 10 mins, 2nd leg – 13 h 14 mins, 3rd leg – 15 h 03 mins)

The only other individuals to have completed this feat are Philip Rush, Alison Streeter, Chloe McCardel and Sarah Thomas.

Erikson also completed a two way crossing of the English Channel in 1975 in a time of 30 h 00 mins and again in 1979 in a time of 22 h 16 mins. His total number of successful English Channel swims stands at 11, spanning a period from 1969 to 1981.

Erikson died of an infection on July 28, 2014 in Boca Raton. He was an inductee to the International Swimming Hall of Fame of that year.
