= Swim Girl, Swim =

1927 film by Clarence G. Badger

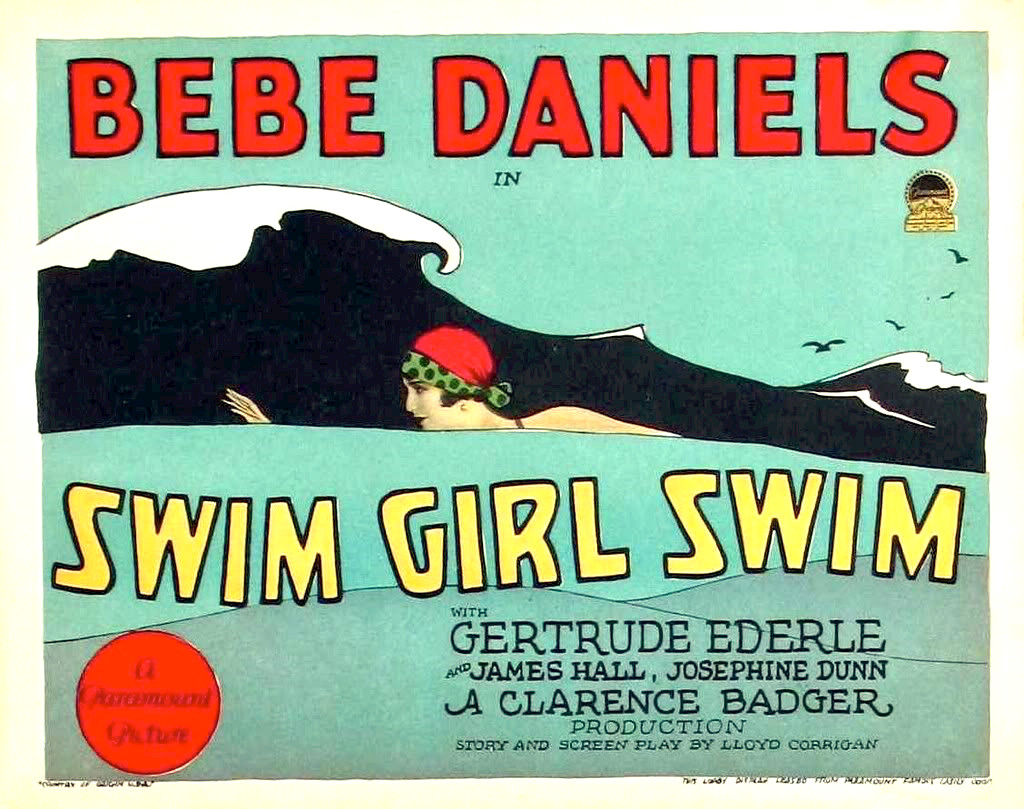
- Lobby card
- Directed by: Clarence Badger
- Written by: Lloyd Corrigan (story & scenario); George Marion, Jr. (intertitles)
- Produced by: Adolph Zukor; Jesse Lasky; B. P. Schulberg (associate)
- Starring: Bebe Daniels
- Cinematography: J. Roy Hunt
- Distributed by: Paramount Pictures
- Release date: September 3, 1927
- Running time: 70 minutes; 7 reels
- Country: United States
- Language: Silent (English intertitles)

Swim Girl, Swim is a lost 1927 American silent romantic comedy film produced and distributed by Famous Players–Lasky and Paramount Pictures, now amalgamated as Paramount Famous Lasky. It was directed by Clarence Badger and starred Bebe Daniels. English Channel swimmer Gertrude Ederle has a guest appearance.

== Cast ==
- Bebe Daniels as Alice Smith
- James Hall as Jerry Marvin
- Gertrude Ederle as herself
- Josephine Dunn as Helen Tracey
- William Austin as Mr. Spangle, PhD.
- James T. Mack as Professor Twinkle (credited as James Mack)

== Production ==
Swimming race scenes were shot on location at Naples, California.
