= Charles Chapman (swimmer) =

American swimmer

Charles Chapman Jr.
Personal information
- Nickname: Charlie the Tuna
- Born: 1954 (age 71–72) Buffalo, New York, U.S.
- Education: Sacramento State
- Height: 185.4 cm (6 ft 1 in)
- Weight: 185 lb (84 kg)

Sport
- Sport: Swimming
- Strokes: Freestyle, Butterfly
- Club: Arden Hills
- College team: L. A. City College (briefly)
- Coach: Sherm Chavoor

Charles "Charlie the Tuna" Chapman (born 1954) is an American distance swimmer specializing in the butterfly stroke, who in 1981 became the first Black swimmer to successfully cross the English channel, and in 1988 set a record for swimming twice around New York's Manhattan Harbor, a 28.5 mile marathon. In 1997, he became the first person to swim twice around Alcatraz Island, departing from San Francisco.

== Biography ==
Chapman was born in Buffalo, New York in 1954 and started swimming around the age of six. His parents were Catherine, and Charles Chapman Senior, who operated the Men's Clothing Shop, Mr. C's, on Bailey Avenue in Buffalo. After swimming for Woodlawn Junior High, and helping them win the city championship, Chapman attended Buffalo's Bishop Turner High School, where he set the school record for the 100-yard butterfly. He was a 1973 graduate.

In Buffalo, he had difficulty gaining entry to swim clubs, as there were few open in Black neighborhoods in the winter, so he would occasionally sneak into the Canisius College pool. Buffalo weather offered a short summer outdoor swimming season. He swam often in the local YMCA in Buffalo but came to California after High School graduation with the knowledge that it offered better swimming facilities and training.

=== Training in California ===
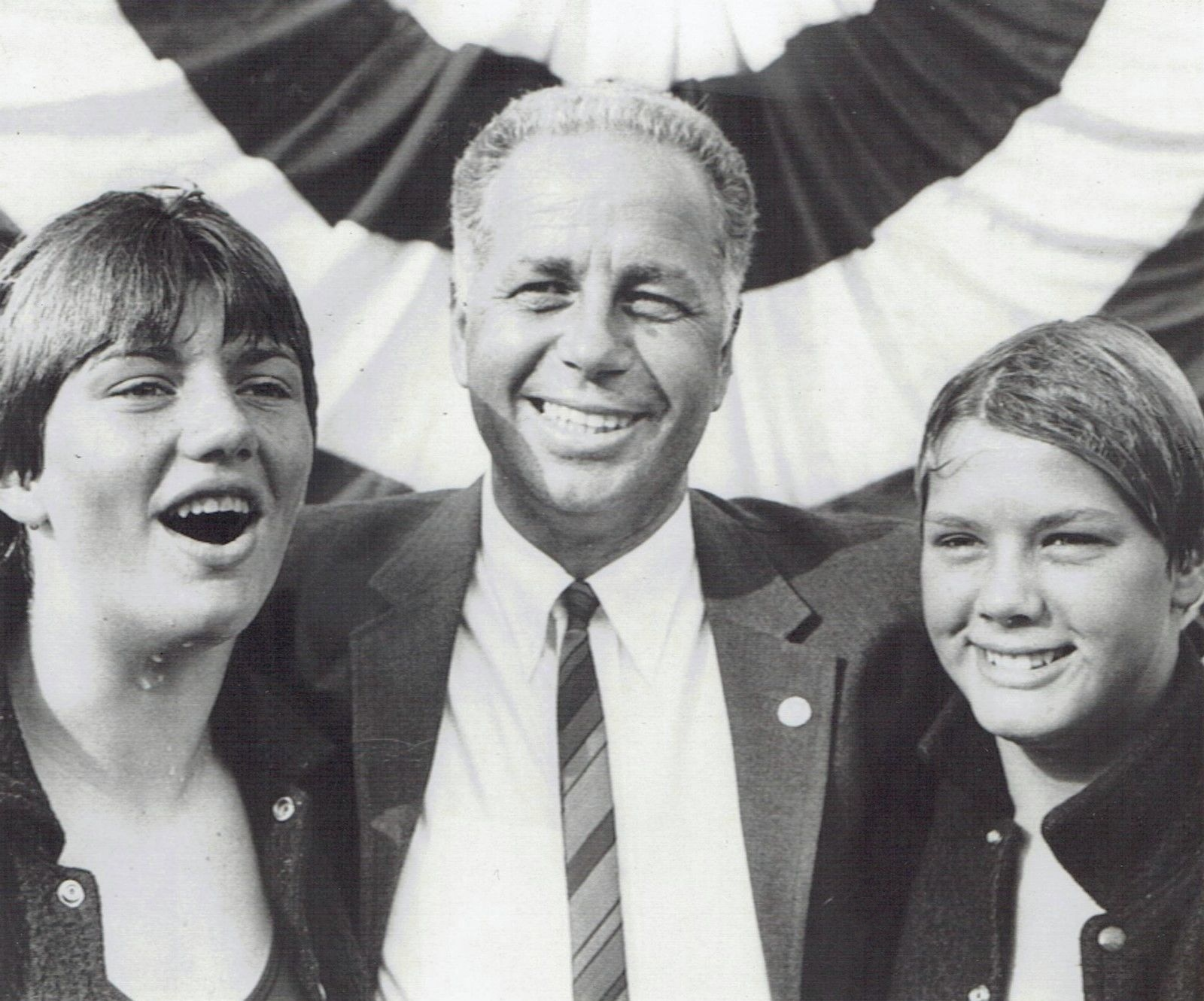
Chavoor (c) with Olympians Sue Pedersen (l) and Debbie Meyer (r), '67

Living first in Los Angeles with his sister, Chapman swam for a short period for the L.A. City College team. By 1974, he had moved to Sacramento and was swimming for the Arden Hills Swimming Club in Carmichael, coached by legendary Olympic Coach Sherm Chavoor, who said of Chapman, "He's a good swimmer, even if he's a little old". From his earliest days as a coach, Champman encouraged talented swimmers from diverse backgrounds, religions and ethnicities to swim with his program. Chapman had been invited to swim with Chavoor before he moved to Sacramento.

Chapman swam for Sacramento City College for the two years he attended the school and entered about 10 American Athletic Union swims per year. His training, around the age of 20, consisted of 10,000 yards a day or about six miles, a regiment suitable for a competitive college swimmer in that era. For open water training, he swam upstream in the American River near Paradise Beach, for as long as two hours. He lifted weights aided by a trainer with knowledge of the needs of distance swimmers. He received some welcome financial assistance from the beneficent Dolphin Swim club of San Francisco. The Dolphin Club sponsord a New Years swim, and rowboat contests a year and many of its swimming members train to swim the English Channel. To toughen his body to the cold, Chapman sat in Arden Hills' wading pool after loading it with ice, and would put on weight when planning long cold-water swims. Several local newspapers supported his ambitions with their stories and provided coverage. By 1978, he had seriously set his sights on an English Channel Swim.

Training for the Channel Swim, he build to a 26-mile swim in the Sacramento River, and completed a number of training swims in Lake Ontario and Lake Erie near Buffalo to prepare for the cold and currents of the channel.

=== First Black swimmer to cross English channel ===
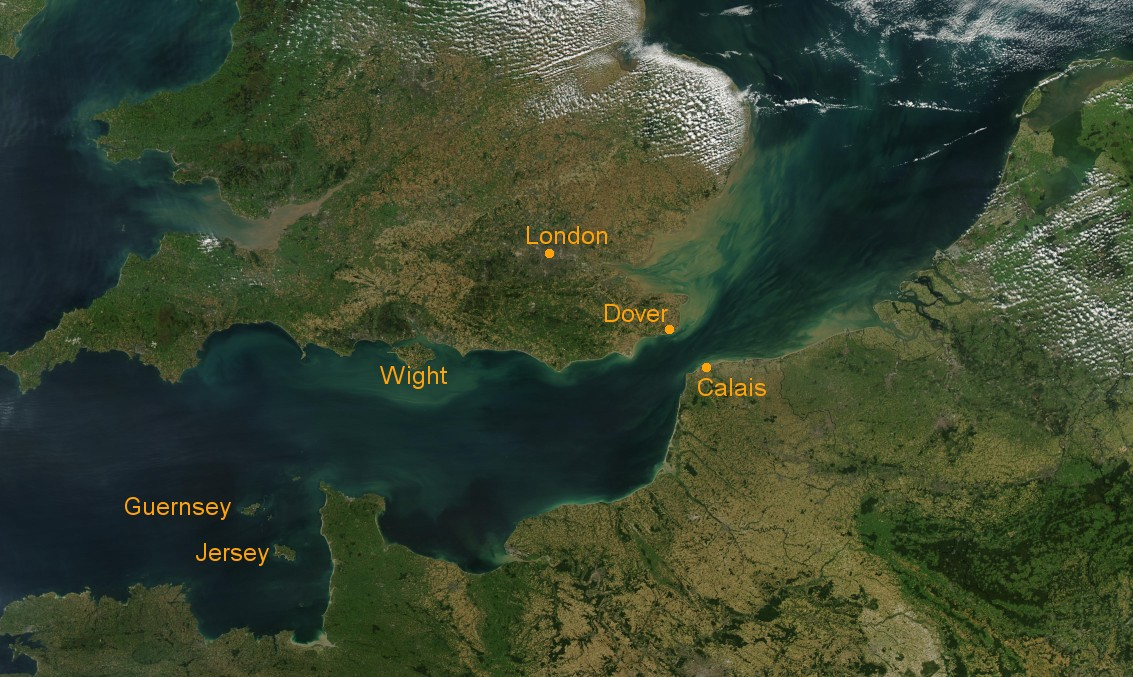
The English Channel, showing France to the south.

On August 25, 1981, he became the first black swimmer to cross the English Channel. Chapman received financial support for the costly undertaking from his father who had helped organize a small group of Buffalo investors. Chapman completed the crossing from England to France with a respectable time of 13:30.00. The story in the London Daily Telegraph approximated the time as 12:30 considering that France was one hour ahead of England. Champman said his main obstacles were a cramp in his left leg through most of the swim, three boats the team had to go around, the coldness of the water at 61 degrees, and a current that extended the anticipated distance of the swim. Chapman landed at Sangatte Bay near Calais in Southern France and walked the required ten steps on shore to verify his swim. With current and tides, it was estimated he swam a rough total of around 37 miles, landing at night at 10:10 pm on the French shore. The swim was recorded as starting in Dover, England at 8:40 am.

In the service boat was Chapman's promoter and sponsor Henry Clark, a former boxer, and the official observer for the Channel Swimming Association, John Winyard. Winyard dove in to swim the last 300 yards with Champman, but when the cold water of the channel proved too much for him, he had to be located, rescued, and pulled back into the accompanying dinghy which resulted in a bit of drama. Finding both Chapman and Clark in the dark was challenging, even with the use of a flashlight. The crossing was completed exactly 106 years to the day after the first recorded crossing made by Matthew Webb in 1875.

=== Education ===
At the time of the swim, Chapman was a student at Sacramento State University completing a degree in Commercial Recreation, and had previously completed a degree in Social Science from Sacramento City College. The newly accomplished swimmer expressed a strong interest in making swim training more available to Black athletes as a sport of choice. In July 1980–81, he attempted but did not finish Atlantic City New Jersey's Around the Island Swim.

=== Alcatraz to San Francisco ===
He swam the roughly mile and a quarter or half from Alcatraz Island to the Dolphin Swim Club in San Francisco on July 28, 1978, in around 39:55, and though far from the record of 27:28, he fought a bitter cold, a strong tide, white caps, 56 degree water, winds and a 53F outside temperature.

In late July 1983, Chapman swam from the beach at San Francisco's Aquatic Park to Alcatraz Island and back to San Francisco in 1:33 using the Butterfly stroke. He was pleased with the results, as he felt confident the swim had never been completed swimming exclusively butterfly, though he had trouble gaining forward momentum initially because of the tides.

In 1987, he became the first man to swim the 14-mile New York Harbor course from the South Street Seaport to the Statue of Liberty to Brooklyn's Coney Island, using only the Butterfly stroke.

=== Twice around Manhattan Harbor world record, 28.5 Miles ===
On August 22, 1988, he earned a world record by twice circumnavigating the island of Manhattan counterclockwise, a distance of 28.5 miles, in 9 hours, 25 minutes and 8 seconds. The previous year, Los Angeles Dodgers vice president Al Campanis had stated that blacks couldn't swim because their bones were too heavy; Chapman, in response, said, "I'm like Jackie Robinson paving the way, except I'll be wearing a little bathing suit", and ""Silly stuff like that, some people believe. Hell, you watch me swim around Manhattan".

On his second attempt at swimming twice around Manhattan Harbor counterclockwise on August 19, 1989, a swim he had become known for, he attained a time of 9:35:21, only 10 minutes and thirteen second off his record swim the previous year.

=== Arrest ===
In July 1991, Chapman was arrested in East Buffalo and later sentenced to two years and nine months in federal prison, the minimum under sentencing guidelines, for his part in a conspiracy to sell five ounces of cocaine. An undercover agent who purchased the cocaine from Chapman arrested him and two others involved in the transaction. The incident did not completely derail Chapman's swimming ambitions, but was a setback, as he had been planning a second English Channel swim. It may have negatively impacted how he was perceived by the public and his success at recruiting and retaining sponsors.

== Once around Alcatraz Island ==
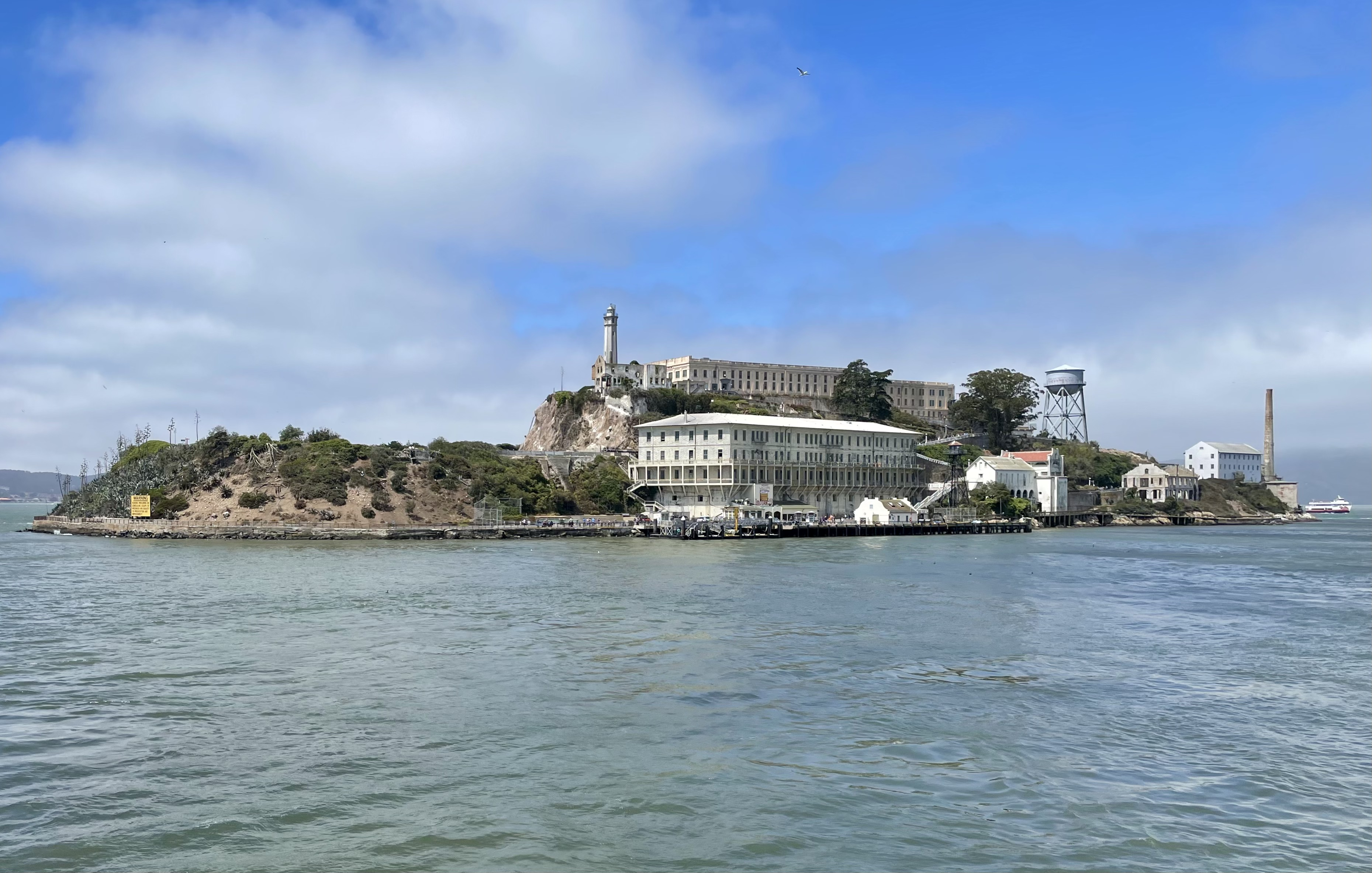
View of Alcatraz Island, 2021

Prior to the sentencing for his arrest, on August 17, 1991, Chapman swam from Pier 27 at San Francisco's Embarcadero Center around the Island of Alcatraz and back to Pier 27, in just over three hours. Chapman was 37 and still able to complete the swim doing only the demanding Butterfly stroke. The water was 61F, comfortable for Alcatraz, but the distance would be approximated at close to six miles with current and jellyfish.

=== Twice around Alcatraz Island ===
At the advancing age of 43 on September 6, 1997, Chapman became the only person to swim twice around the Island of Alcatraz after departing from and returning to San Francisco. The swim was an announcement to the world that Chapman was back doing swims after serving time for his arrest in 1991. Two weeks earlier, outside his home of Buffalo, New York, he had prepped for the event by swimming seven miles from Peace Bridge to the Erie Basin Marina in 1:40.

Despite strong currents, he did the butterfly throughout the Alcatraz swim. Starting from San Francisco's Pier 43 1/2 at 9 am, Chapman completed the historic swim to Alcatraz, double circumnavigation of the Island, and return to San Francisco, in 5 hours 10 minutes. San Francisco's Mayor Willie Brown, and a number of youths watched the swim from a boat following Chapman. It took Chapman about 45 minutes to reach Alcatraz. Ocean currents became very strong around the Island and on his return to the mainland.

In 1997, he was working as a Swimming instructor back in Buffalo and still planning swims in the Alcatraz area. He had kept his promise to bring the sport of swimming and the benefits it offered to young swimmers.

== See also ==
List of successful English Channel swimmers
