= Nejib Belhedi =

Tunisian swimmer (born 1952)

Personal information
- Full name: نجيب بلهادي
- Nickname: نجيب بلهادي
- Nationality: Tunisian
- Born: 25 July 1952 (age 74) Sfax, Tunisia

Sport
- Sport: Swimming
Medal record
Registered in Guinness Book of Records on 5 October 2019 for the longest non-stop and unassisted marathon swim, lasting 76 hours and 30 minutes

Nejib Belhedi (Arabic: نجيب بلهادي; born 25 July, 1952) is a Tunisian Marathon Icy and Iron open-water swimmer.

== Achievements ==
1. Kerkennah Island-Sfax, 20 km, 7 h, 24 min, the first marathon swimmer in Tunisia and the first who swam Kerkennah–Sfax on 25 June 1991, on the occasion of commemorating the creation of the Tunisian Army.
2. English Channel (England to France) on 15–16 September 1993 in 16 hours, 35 minutes, a swim on the highest tide under Force 4 conditions. As the first and only Tunisian to accomplish the English Channel, the Channel Swimming Association created a trophy bearing the name of Belhedi: the Belhedi Trophy for the Channel Swim on the Highest Tide, honouring the Channel Swimmers, who swim the Channel on the Highest Tide in the season.
3. Cap Bon-La Marsa, 35K, on 30 May 1992, in 11 hours and 14 minutes.
4. 24 hours non-stop in a swimming pool in Tataouine on 6–7 June 1993. Total distance swum: 51.577 kilometers.
5. Strait of Sicily, from Pantelleria to Kelibia, 72K, on 17 June 1995. The swim was stopped after 17 hours due to numerous jellyfish stings.
6. La Galite Channel in Tunisia on 31 July 1999, from La Galite Island to Cap Serrat, 40K, in 7 hours and 15 minutes.
7. Nejib Belhedi accomplished 1400 km along the total coast of Tunisia during 2011-2012, all seasons.
8. Title of the World Performance of the Year 2011 for his marathon 1400 K swim across Tunisia, honoured on the RMS Queen Mary, California, Los Angeles, on 22 September 2012.
9. The title of World Man of the Year 2016 for his Iron Swim and Ouma for kids realizations was honoured at Bizerta Resort in Bierta, Tunisia, by WOWSA on 12 September 2017.
10. Nejib Belhedi swam Tunisian Dam lakes (Icy and Cold Swim):
  - Oued Mallegue Dam: 6 March 2013, 5°C (41°F), 6 km, 2 h
  - Jedliane Kasserine Dam: 20 February 2013, 3°C (37.4°F), 3 km, 1 h
  - Sidi Barrak Dam :20 April 2013, 10°C (50°F), 15 km, 4 h
  - Sidi Salem Dam: 23 March 2013, 7°C (44.6°F), 13 km, 3 h, 25 mins
  - Oued Mallegue Dam: 26 December 2017, 2.5°C(36.5°F), 3 km, 43 mins
  - Barbara Dam: 20 January 2018, 1°C (33.8°F), 3 km, 1 h, 45 mins.
11. On 17 August 2013, Belhedi swam between the Diomede Islands in a time of 39 minutes, covering 4 km in 2°C and making the circuit from Russia to the USA in a way different from that swum by Lynne Cox.
12. On 15, 16, 17, 18 September 2018, Nejib Belhedi accomplished the 120 km Swim No Stop (Tunisia-Gulf of Gabes) from the Southern Salin Basin in Thyna-Sfax, through the middle of Boughrara Gulf, to Jilj Island in 76 hours, 30 minutes, at the age of 66. This is included as the longest solo swim in the sea by the World Open Water Swimming Association.
13. In September 2018, Nejib Belhedi was honoured by the Minister of Youth and Sport Affairs of Tunisia for his successful 120-km swim from Sfax to Djerba.
14. In October 2018, Nejib Belhedi was awarded the National Defence Shield by the Minister of National Defence of Tunisia for his successful 120 km Swim from Sfax to Djerba.
15. On 10 November 2018, Nejib Belhedi was identified as the title holder and winner of the longest solo swim in the sea in history by WOWSA at the Olympic Club in San Francisco.
16. Iron Swim accomplishments:
  - On 14 February 2015, a boat pulled 180 kg for 7 km in the Kerkennah Sea in Tunisia.
  - On 24 April 2015, the boat pulled 180 kg for 11 km around Kerkennah Island in Tunisia.
  - On 24 May 2015, the boat pulled 180 kg with two children, pilot Mahdi Aghir, and observer Mohamed Rekik over 15.26 km across the Golfe de Skanes in the Monastir Sea in 6 hours and 40 minutes from the One Resort Hotel beach to Dkhlia beach.
  - On 31 July 2015, the boat pulled a mini-catamaran weighing 180 kg over 21 km in the Gulf of Gabes in Tunisia.
  - On 10 September 2015, the boat pulled 180 kg over 20 km in Djerba Island Sea in Tunisia.
  - On 7 October 2015, the boat pulled a 1.5-ton boat carrying a camel and his master over 4 km in the Mahdia Port in Tunisia (the Camel Swim).
  - On 23 October 2015, a boat pulled a 2-ton boat with 3 people over 4 km in the Mahdia Port, Tunisia (the Olive Tree Swim).
  - On 7 November 2015, a boat pulled a 21-ton ship named Hannibal with people at 168 meters in Marina Tabarka in Tunisia with observer Hatem Askri.
  - On 19 November 2015, the boat pulled a 22-ton ship named Mahdi with people over 200 meters in 11 minutes in Port El Kantaoui, Tunisia, with observer Nabil Ouerzli.
  - On 23 December 2015, the boat pulled a convoy of two ships totaling 70 tons, including a ship named Mohamed Ali, with people over 350 meters, in 39 minutes Port El Kantaoui, Tunisia.
  - On 26 March 2016, the boat-pulled a 23-ton ship named Albatross with observer Hatem Askri and a football team on board over 500 meters in 23 minutes in Marina Tabarka in Tunisia.
  - On 28 May 2016, the boat pulled a convoy of 2 ships totalling 70 tons with people over 550 meters in 20 minutes in the Bizerta Channel in Tunisia.
  - On 23 October 2016, the boat pulled a convoy of 3 ships totalling 100 tons, including the 40-ton Mohamed Habib with pilot Rachid Jbalia, the 25-ton Noura with pilot Atef Neffati, and the 35-ton Bibane with pilot Nabil Jannadi, over 550 meters in 32 minutes and 30 seconds in the Bizerta Channel in Tunisia.
  - On 22 May 2017, the boat pulled a ship named Hached—SONOTRAK totalling 1014 tons with people over 425 meters in 25 minutes— into the Sfax Port in Tunisia.
17. Nejib Belhedi won the Poseidon Iron Swim Trophy as the world's unbeatable Panarmic Iron Swimmer on 19 November 2015 in El Kantaoui Port.
18. Nejib Belhedi completed the longest marathon swimming duration in the SEA (76Hours, 30 minutes), solo, no stop, no assistance from South of Sfax city (Thyna) to Djerba Island (Jlij Island - Boughrara Lake), 120 km, on 15–18 September 2018 under the regulation of the World Open Water Swimming Association (WOWSA).
19. Nejib Belhedi entered the Guinness Book on 5 October 2019 at Redondo Beach (Los Angeles), in the first event organized by WOWSA - as the world record Holder for the longest swimming in open sea under World Open Water Swimming regulation for 76 Hr 30 min on 15–18 September 2018. This Guinness Book of World Records registration of Nejib Belhedi is the first in the history of Tunisian sports.
20. Nejib Belhedi (69 years old) completed his non-stop swim of 40 km from the Big Kuriat Island to Boujaafer Beach (Sousse) in an exceptional record: 10 H 43'15" on 11 August 2020, this race is realized under WOWSA swimming rules and organized in partnership with the association "Notre Grand Bleu", aiming to raise public awareness for the preservation of turtles.

20.Nejib Belhedi completed Djerba Between 30 October and 1 November 2020, the Pearl of Peace, a 155 km swim around Djerba, Tunisia in 47 hours 50 minutes 10 seconds at the age of 69. It was the longest unassisted circumnavigation swim by a man, ratified by WOWSA. He was honored on the 6th of December 2020, by the Hasdrubal Marathon Swimming Hall of Fame in Tunisia in partnership with the Hasdrubal chain presided by Sir Raouf Amouri and WOWSA. This Hall of Fame is located on Djerba Island at Hasdrubal Prestige Thalassa & Spa (in the tourist zone of Midoun) in Tunisia.

== Nejib Belhedi as Organiser and Representative ==
- Nejib Belhedi is the organiser of the 2017 Global Open Water Swimming Conference which was held in Bizerta Resort from 9 to 14 September 2018.
- He is the creator, promoter and organiser of all editions; Dialogue across the Sea 2009–2010, Tunisian Islands Tour, Swim of Peace 2007.
- He is the organiser of the intercontinental Iron Swim Parade in Bizerta Channel on 13 September 2017.
- Nejib Belhedi is the Organiser of all his Marathon Swims, Iron Swims and Ouma for kids events.
- Belhedi is the organizer of The Dialog Sahara - North Pole - August 2013 in Douz -South of Tunisia and Little Diomede - Bering Strait.
- Belhedi is the Representative of The Channel Swimming Association in Tunisia, Libya and Algeria.
