= USS Illinois =

USS Illinois may refer to:

- USS Illinois (1864), was a Java-class screw frigate down in 1864, but was never completed and broken up for scrap in 1872
- USS Illinois (BB-7), was the lead ship of the Illinois class of battleships, launched in 1898, renamed Prairie State in 1941 and sold for scrap in 1956
- USS Illinois (BB-65), would have been an Iowa-class battleship, but construction was canceled before launch
- USS Illinois (SSN-786), is a Virginia-class submarine, commissioned on October 29, 2016

== See also ==
- A replica battleship Illinois was a full-scale mockup of an Indiana-class battleship, created as an exhibit for the 1893 World's Columbian Exposition
