= Sarah Thomas (marathon swimmer) =

American marathon swimmer

Personal information
- Born: 1982 (age 43–44) Conifer, Colorado, United States

Sport
- Sport: Swimming

Sarah Thomas (born 1982) is an American marathon swimmer. She is the first person to complete four consecutive crossings of the English Channel and the first person to swim a current-neutral swim over 100 miles (160 km). She holds the world record for longest, second-, and third-longest current-neutral swims, and various other records in both fresh and salt water categories.

== Personal life and early swimming ==
Thomas was swimming in a year-round swimming team by the age of ten. She swam in high school at the 200-yard (180 m) and 500-yard (460 m) freestyle, and in the mile (1,600 m) in her senior year. She continued swimming while studying for a degree in political science and journalism at the University of Connecticut, but gave it up while gaining her masters in legal administration at the University of Denver. She took up swimming again and joined a Masters swim team after graduating.

In August 2007 Thomas made her first long swim, the annual 6.2-mile (10 km) Horsetooth Open Water Swim at Horsetooth Reservoir, near Fort Collins, Colorado, over 5,400 feet (1,600 m) above sea level. She finished second in the women's and the fifth overall, in 2 hours 39 minutes 8 seconds. Speaking over her first open water race experience, she has said, "I got out of the water, and I was fighting back tears because I loved it so much."

She works as a recruiter for a health care company, and lives in Conifer, Colorado with her husband.

== Lake Powell ==
After being introduced to the sport of open water swimming through the Horsetooth Open Water Swim, Thomas went on to become the 59th person to complete the Triple Crown of Open Water Swimming in 2012 among other noteworthy swims such as Loch Ness.

On July 19, 2013, Thomas became the first person to complete a 42.5-mile (68.4 km) two-way crossing of Lake Tahoe, completing the double-crossing in 22 hours 30 minutes. Less than two months later, on 7 September 2013, she became the first person to complete a two-way crossing of Lake Memphremagog in the 50-mile (80.4 km) In Search of Memphre race. She completed the swim in 30 hours 1 minute These back-to-back back-to-backs earned her the 2013 Barra Award for Most Impressive Body of Work in Marathon Swimming. She was also nominated for the World Open Water Swimming (WOWSA) Woman of the Year for the "unprecedented" nature of both swims that each "elevated her to the elusive 24-Hour Club status".

In 2017, Thomas broke the world record for longest current-neutral swim with her crossing of Lake Powell. The Lake Powell swim was an 80-mile (130 km) crossing of Lake Powell along the Utah-Arizona border from Bullfrog to Wahweap beginning on October 4, 2016 and ending on October 6, 2016 in 56 hours 5 minutes 26 seconds. Her solo swim across Lake Powell was voted the 2016 World Open Water Swimming Performance of the Year for "[stretching] her imagination and that of the entire global open water swimming community".

== Lake Champlain ==
One year after breaking the world record for longest current-neutral swim for Lake Powell, Thomas broke the world record once more in 2017, this time by over 20 miles (32 km) in Lake Champlain. Her 104.6-mile (168.3 km) swim was the first current-neutral open water swim of over 100 miles (160 km), and as of 2021 the world record for longest unassisted open-water swim. Her swim began on August 7, 2017 at Rouses Point, New York at the north of the lake and took a loop to and around Gardiner Island, Addison County, Vermont before ending at Rouses Point, New York on August 10, 2017. The swim took a total of 67 hours and 16 minutes. For this feat she garnered another nomination by WOWSA for Open Water Swimming Performance of the Year and was described as "simply mind-boggling and typical of Thomas’ tenacity".

== English Channel four way ==
Two months after her historic swim in Lake Champlain, in November 2017, Thomas was diagnosed with breast cancer, and underwent surgery, radiotherapy and chemotherapy, swimming as much as possible during her treatment.

On September 17, 2019, one year after completing treatment, she became the first person to swim four consecutive crossings of the English Channel. The swim took her 54 hours 10 minutes to complete. The swim is also considered the second-longest current-neutral swim in history, after Thomas' swim of Lake Champlain. A documentary film about this swim, The Other Side, was made, funded through Kickstarter.

== Other notable swims ==
- On 22 August 2015, she completed a 22.5 miles (36.2 km) crossing of Loch Ness in Scotland in 10 hours 52 minutes at the age of 33.
- On 21 November 2015, she completed an Ice Mile in Wellington Lake, Bailey, Colorado, US, at an altitude of 8,000 feet (2,400 m) above sea level, by swimming 1.1 miles (1.8 km) in 40.2 °F (4.57 °C) water in 27 minutes 7 seconds, observed by Craig Lenning and Cliff Crozier.
- On 3 July 2015, she completed a 27.5-mile (44.3 km) crossing of Flathead Lake in Montana in 13 hours 39 minutes at the age of 33.
- On 20 June 2015, she won the 36-mile (58 km) END-WET down the Red River of the North in North Dakota in 9 hours 43 minutes at the age of 33.
- On 2 June 2017, she completed a 25-mile (40 km) double circumnavigation of Mercer Island, Washington in 12 hours 22 minutes 20 seconds at the age of 35.
- In March 2019, she completed a crossing of the Cook Strait between the North Island and South Island of New Zealand.
- On 10 July 2022, she became the first person to complete the 43-mile (69 km) double crossing of the North Channel between Britain and Ireland, in 21 hours 46 minutes 38 seconds.

== Additional honors and awards ==
- Thomas won the 2017 Solo Swim of the Year by the Marathon Swimmers Federation.
- She was named one of the World's 50 Most Adventurous Open Water Women in 2017, 2018, and 2019 by the World Open Water Swimming Association.
- Thomas was selected as the Colorado Sportswomen of the Year.
- Inducted as an Honor Swimmer in the International Marathon Swimming Hall of Fame, Class of 2018.
- Inducted in the Vermont Open Water Swimming Hall of Fame, Class of 2017.

== Selected publications ==
- "4-way English Channel swimmer Sarah Thomas talks cold water tolerance". outdoorswimmer.com. 17 December 2020.
