= Antonio Abertondo =

Argentine swimmer

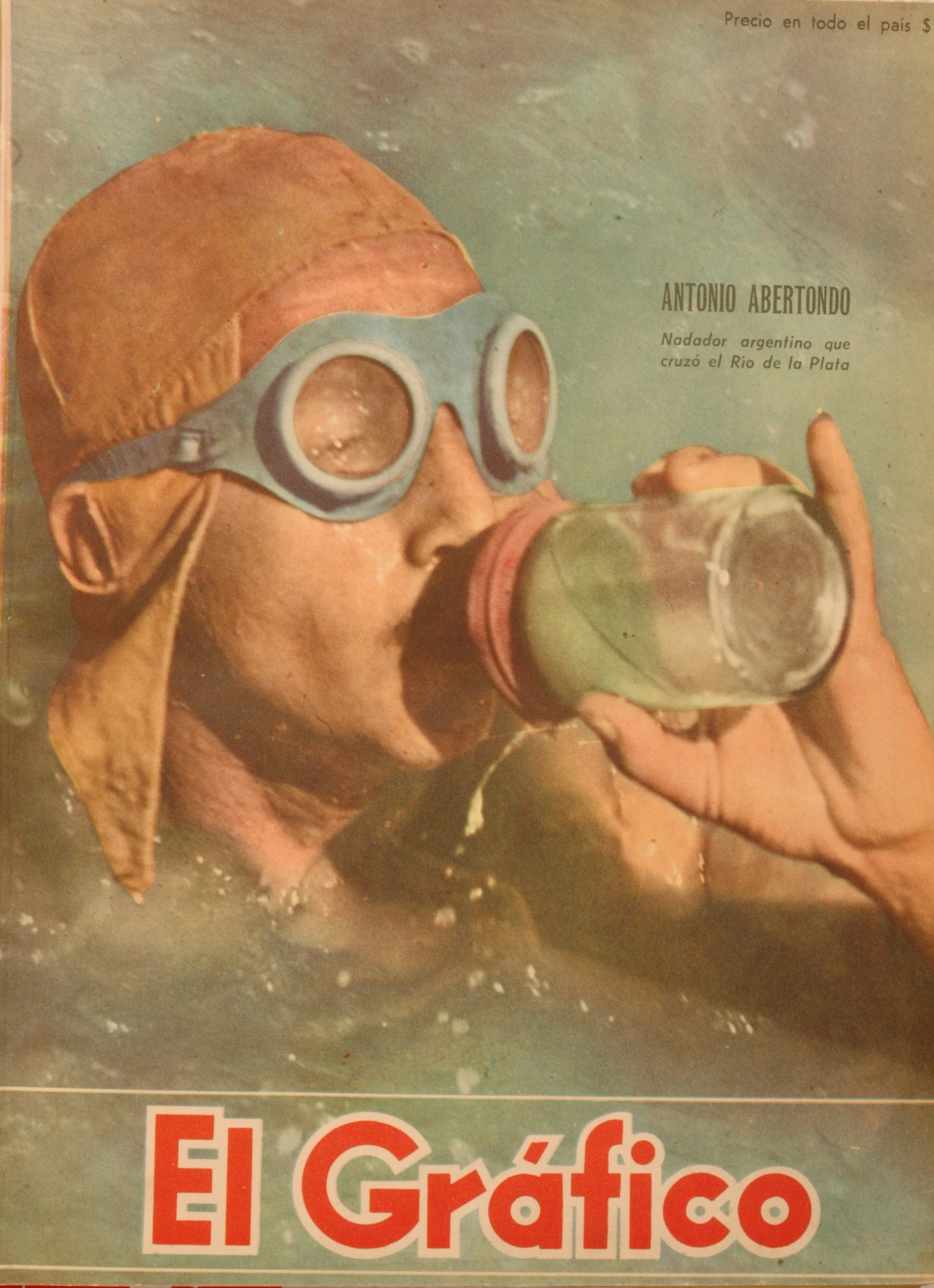
- Antonio Abertondo - El Gráfico 1954

Personal information
- Born: August 1, 1918
- Died: July 6, 1978 (aged 59)

Sport
- Sport: Swimming

Antonio Abertondo (August 1, 1918 – July 6, 1978) was an Argentine long-distance swimmer. He was the first person to complete a two way swim of the English Channel. He completed the swim on 21 September 1961 in 43 hours 10 minutes, with just a 4-minute rest in France. He also swam the English Channel on three other occasions, in 1950, 1951 and 1954.
