= Gertrude Ederle =

American swimmer (1905–2003)

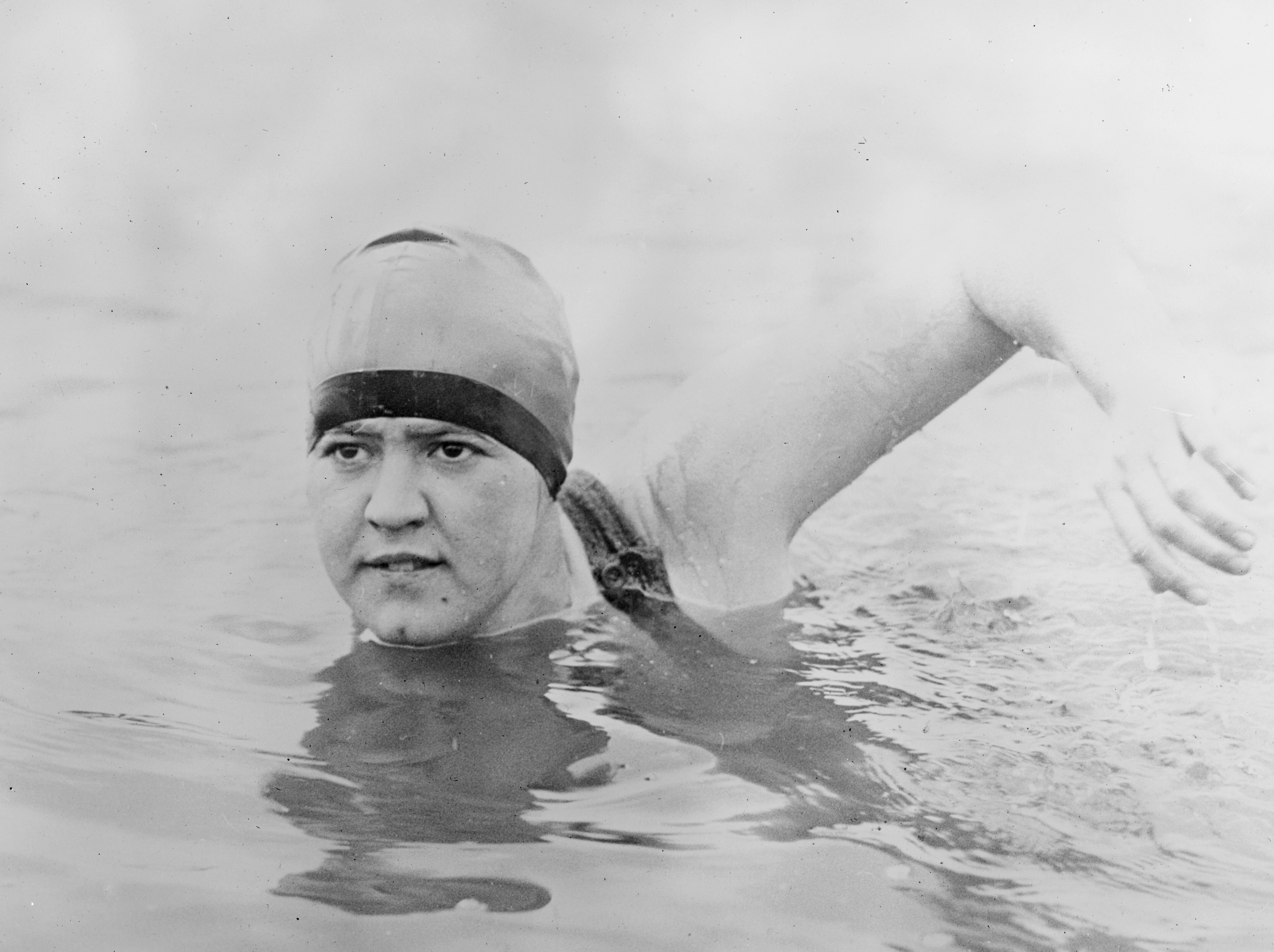

Personal information
- Full name: Gertrude Caroline Ederle
- Nicknames: "Trudy", "Gertie", "Queen of the Waves"
- Born: October 23, 1905 New York, New York, U.S.
- Died: November 30, 2003 (aged 98) Wyckoff, New Jersey, U.S.
- Height: 5 ft 5 in (165 cm)
- Weight: 141 lb (64 kg)

Sport
- Sport: Swimming
- Strokes: Freestyle
- Club: Women's Swimming Association
Medal record
Women's swimming
Representing the United States
Olympic Games
Gold medal – first place	1924 Paris	4×100 m freestyle
Bronze medal – third place	1924 Paris	100 m freestyle
Bronze medal – third place	1924 Paris	400 m freestyle

Gertrude Caroline Ederle (/ˈɛdərli/; October 23, 1905 – November 30, 2003) was an American competition swimmer, Olympic champion, and world record-holder in five events. On August 6, 1926, she became the first woman to swim across the English Channel with her finish time of 14 hours and 45 minutes, beating the record set by Enrique Tirabocchi in 1923 by one hour, 48 minutes. Among other nicknames, the press called her "Queen of the Waves".

== Amateur career ==
Ederle grew up in Manhattan, where her father ran a butcher shop on Amsterdam Avenue, and learned to swim in Highlands, New Jersey. She later trained at the Women's Swimming Association (WSA), founded by Charlotte Epstein. The WSA was a historic organization whose leadership and members campaigned for Women's suffrage, worked to create more swimming events open to women, and sought to increase women's participation in the Olympics. Ederle joined the club when she was only twelve and immediately took to learning the American crawl, developed at the WSA by Head Coach Louis Handley. The same year, she set her first world record in the 880-yard freestyle, becoming the youngest world record holder in swimming. She set eight more world records after that, seven of them in 1922 at Brighton Beach. In total, Ederle held 29 US national and world records from 1921 until 1925.

=== 1924 Paris Olympic medalist ===
At the 1924 Summer Olympics in Paris, Ederle won a gold medal as a member of the U.S. team in the 4×100 meter freestyle relay. She and teammates Euphrasia Donnelly, Ethel Lackie, and Mariechen Wehselau set a world record of 4:58.8 in the event final. Individually, she received bronze medals in the women's 100-meter freestyle and women's 400-meter freestyle races. The U.S. Olympic team was given a ticker-tape parade in 1924.

== Professional career ==
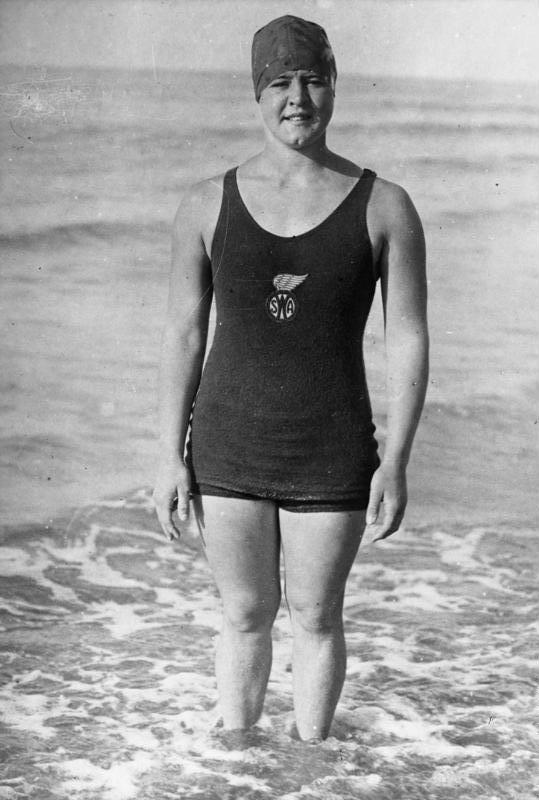
Gertrude Ederle: "People said women couldn't swim the Channel, but I proved they could."

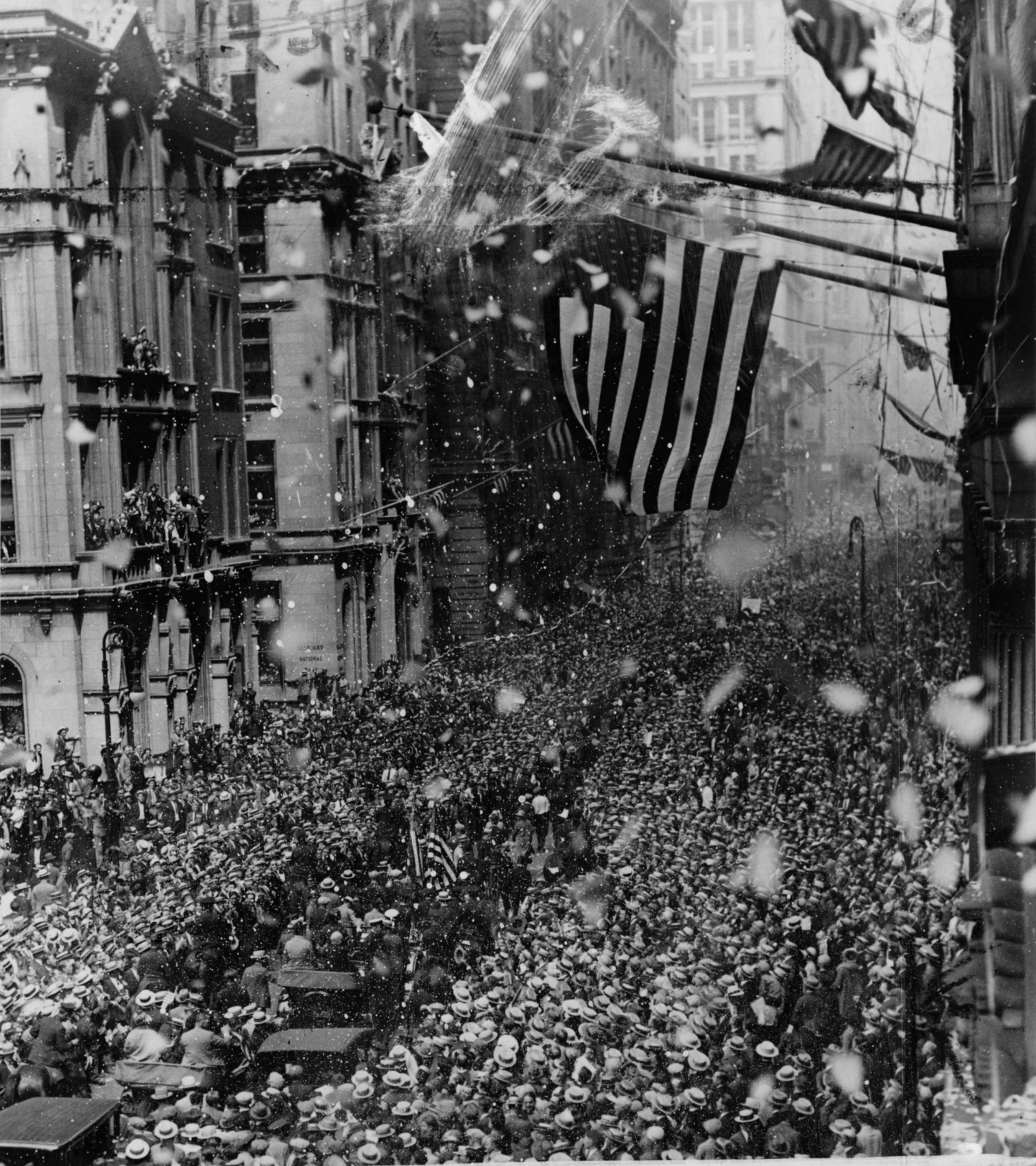
Parade for Ederle along the Canyon of Heroes, 1926

In 1925, Ederle turned professional, swimming the 22 miles (35 km) from Battery Park to Sandy Hook in 7 hours and 11 minutes, a record that stood for 81 years before being broken by Australian swimmer Tammy van Wisse. Ederle's nephew Bob later described his aunt's swim as a "midnight frolic" and a "warm-up" for her later swim across the English Channel.

=== English Channel crossing ===
In 1925, the Women's Swimming Association sponsored Helen Wainwright and Ederle in an attempt at swimming across the English Channel. Helen Wainwright cancelled due to an injury, but Ederle decided to try the crossing on her own. She trained with Jabez Wolffe, who had attempted 22 times to swim the Channel. On August 18, 1925, Ederle made her first attempt, but she was disqualified when Wolffe ordered another swimmer, Ishak Helmy, to recover her from the water. She bitterly disagreed with Wolffe's decision, and it was speculated that he did not want Ederle to succeed.

She returned to New York and began training with coach Bill Burgess, who had successfully swum the Channel in 1911. Ederle also received a contract from both the New York Daily News and Chicago Tribune that paid her expenses and provided her with a modest salary. Approximately one year after her first attempt, she was successful. She started at Cap Gris-Nez in France at 07:08 am on August 6, 1926, and came ashore at Kingsdown, Kent, 14 hours and 34 minutes later, having swum the equivalent of 35 miles due to stormy conditions taking her past her anticipated end point. The first person to greet her was a British immigration officer who requested a passport from "the bleary-eyed, waterlogged teenager". Her record stood until Florence Chadwick swam the Channel in 1950 in 13 hours and 23 minutes.

Prior to Ederle, only five men had completed the swim across the English Channel, with the best time of 16 hours, 33 minutes by Enrique Tirabocchi.

When Ederle returned home, she was greeted with a ticker-tape parade in Manhattan, with more than two million people along the parade route.

=== Later career ===
She made an arrangement with Edward L. Hyman to appear at the Brooklyn Mark Strand Theatre, who paid her significantly more than any prior individual performer. Subsequently, she went on to play herself in a movie (Swim Girl, Swim starring Bebe Daniels) and tour the vaudeville circuit, including later Billy Rose's Aquacade. She met President Coolidge and had a song and a dance step named for her. Her manager, Dudley Field Malone, was not able to capitalize on her fame and popularity, diminishing the financial potential of her vaudeville career. The Great Depression also affected the success of her career. A fall down the steps of her apartment building in 1933 twisted her spine and left her bedridden for several years, but she recovered sufficiently to appear at the 1939 New York World's Fair.

== Death ==
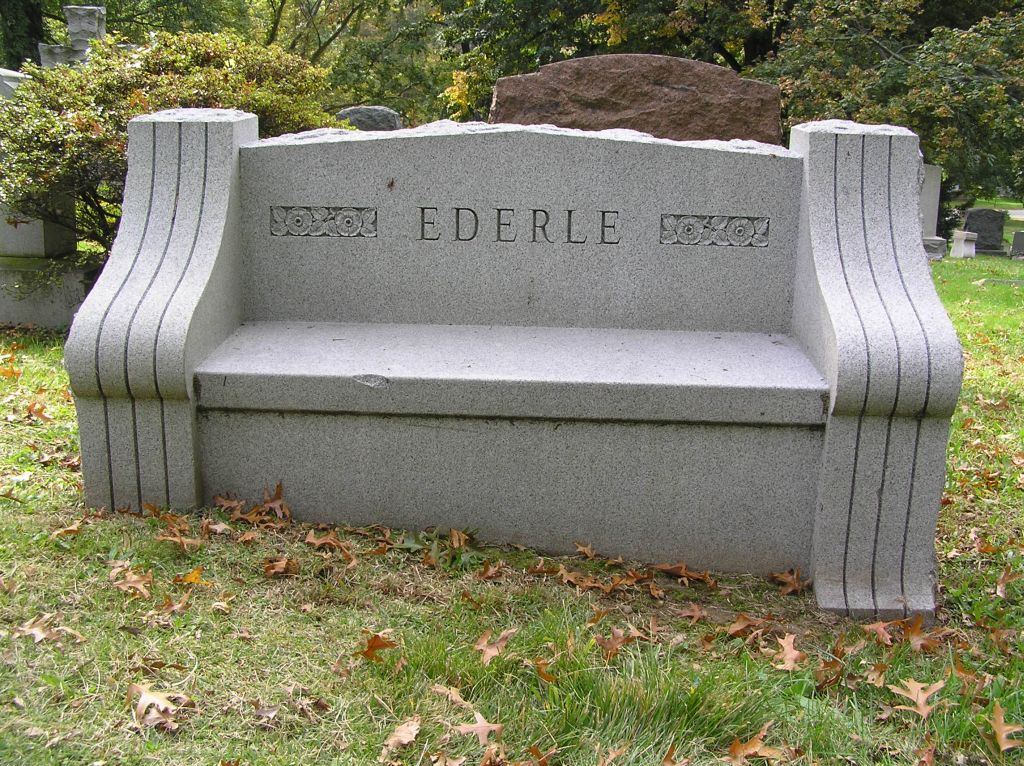
The grave of Gertrude Ederle

As a result of childhood measles, Ederle had poor hearing most of her life, and by the 1940s had lost most of her hearing. Aside from her time in vaudeville, she worked for much of her life as a swimming instructor for deaf children. She never married and, by 2001, lived in a nursing home. She died on November 30, 2003, in Wyckoff, New Jersey, at the age of 98. She was interred in the Woodlawn Cemetery in the Bronx, New York City.

== Legacy ==
Ederle was inducted into the International Swimming Hall of Fame as an "Honor Swimmer" in 1965. She was inducted into the National Women's Hall of Fame in 2003.

An annual swim from New York City's Battery Park to Sandy Hook, New Jersey, is named the Ederle Swim to honor her, and follows the course she swam.

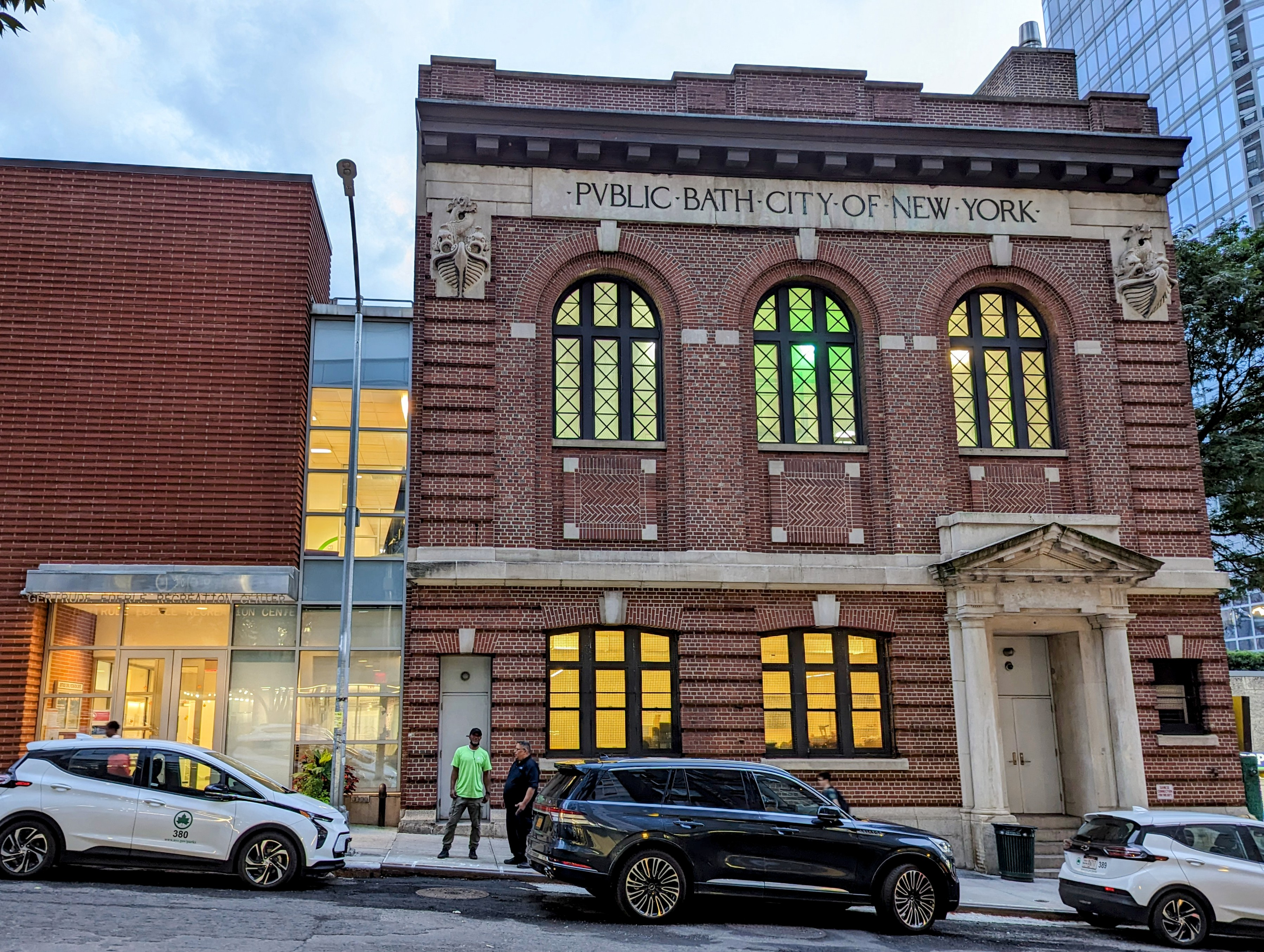
The Gertrude Ederle Recreation Center on 60th Street

The Gertrude Ederle Recreation Center, which opened in 2013 and is located on the Upper West Side of Manhattan, was named for her, and includes an indoor swimming pool.

At the northern side of Meadow Lake in Flushing Meadows–Corona Park, Ederle Terrace commemorates the location of an amphitheater where she performed during the 1939 New York World's Fair.

A BBC Radio 4 play, The Great Swim, by Anita Sullivan, based on the 2008 book of the same name by Gavin Mortimer, was first broadcast on September 1, 2010, and repeated on January 23, 2012. It dramatizes Ederle's record-breaking crossing of the English Channel.

A memorial to Gertrude Ederle's historic channel swim was installed in Kingsdown in 2023. The memorial plaque marks the Oldstairs Bay beach where Ederle came ashore.

A biographical film, Young Woman and the Sea, based on the book of the same name by Glenn Stout, was produced by Walt Disney Pictures and Jerry Bruckheimer, directed by Joachim Rønning, and starring Daisy Ridley as Ederle. The film was released on May 31, 2024.

== See also ==
- List of female adventurers
- List of Olympic medalists in swimming (women)

Records
Preceded by Ethelda Bleibtrey	Women's 100-meter freestyle world record-holder (long course); June 30, 1923 – July 19, 1924	Succeeded by Mariechen Wehselau
