= Bill Burgess =

British swimmer (1872–1950)

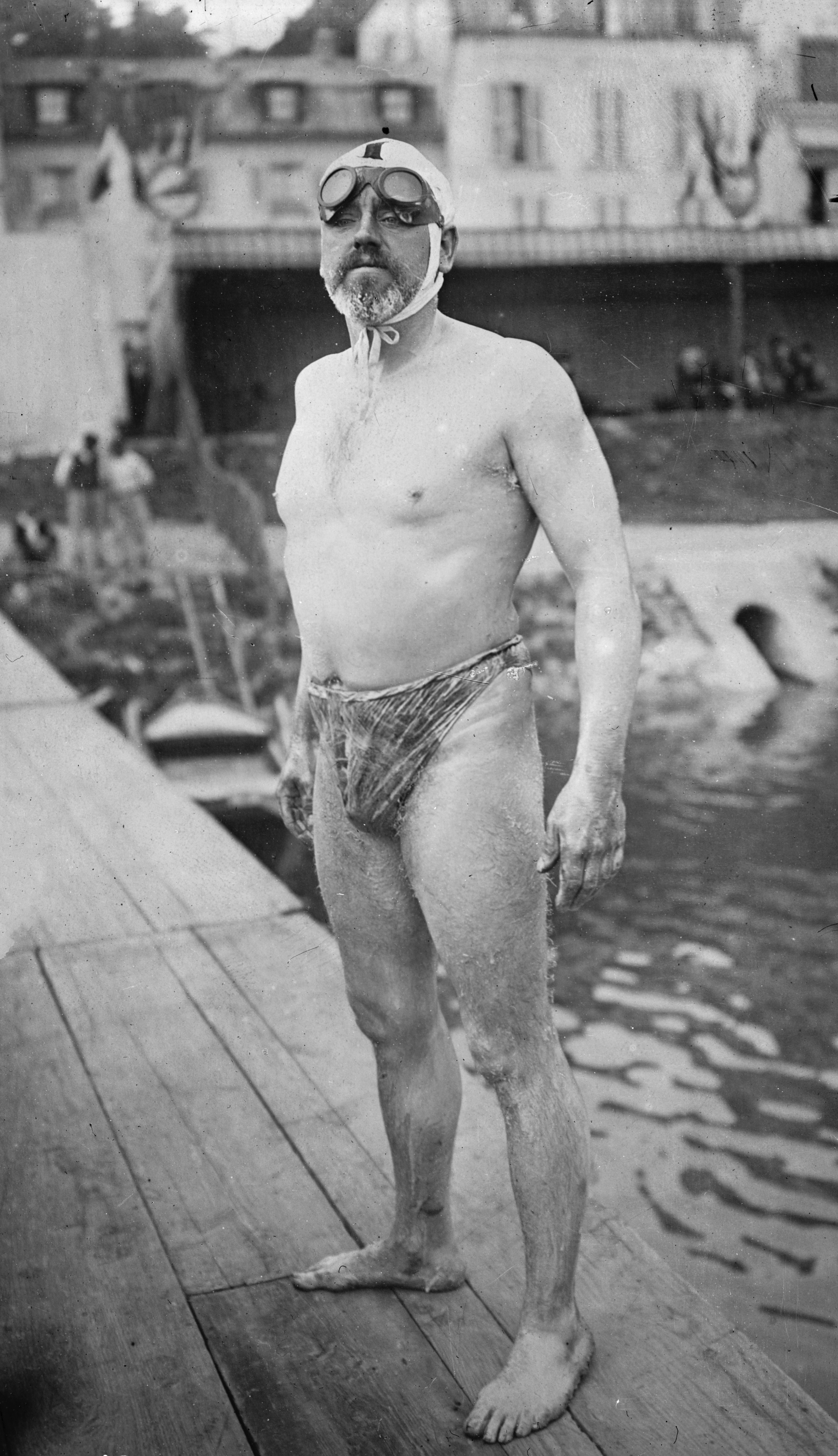
- Burgess in 1911

Personal information
- Full name: Thomas William Burgess
- Born: 15 June 1872 Rotherham, England
- Died: 5 July 1950 (aged 78) Paris, France
- Height: 1.85 m (6 ft 1 in)
- Weight: 95 kg (209 lb)

Sport
- Sport: Swimming
- Club: Libellule de Paris
Medal record
Water polo
Olympic Games
Bronze medal – third place	1900 Paris	Team

Thomas William Burgess (15 June 1872 – 5 July 1950) was the second person to successfully complete a swim of the English Channel after Matthew Webb, following sixteen attempts. Burgess was British but spent most of his life in France, and won a bronze medal with the French water polo team at the 1900 Olympics.

In 1926 he coached Gertrude Ederle, who became the first woman to swim the English Channel.

== Biography ==
Burgess was born at 7 Lyndhurst Place, Rotherham, to Alfred Burgess, a blacksmith from Youlgreave, Derbyshire, and Camilla Anna Peat, a cook from Harthill, South Yorkshire. He had a younger sister, Winifred Edith Burgess. His father worked for the Earl of Shrewsbury and accepted the Earl's offer to run a branch of the business, Shrewsbury and Challinor Rubber Company, in London. The family moved to Westminster, London, around 1882. During this time, Burgess joined a swimming club and swam to Battersea along the Thames.

Around 1889 the 20th Earl of Shrewsbury offered Burgess the opportunity to set up a French branch of the Shrewsbury and Challinor Rubber Company motor tyre business in Paris. Burgess accepted and moved to France, where he spent the rest of his life. On 8 August 1893 Burgess married Anne Rosalie Mioux, a French woman, in Neuilly-Sur-Seine in Paris, and lived with her, running a motor business in Levallois-Perret. They had a son in 1896 and a daughter in 1907. Burgess competed in swimming and water polo at the 1900 Olympics held in Paris and won a bronze medal playing for the French team despite his British nationality, which was allowed by the rules at that time. In swimming, he finished fourth in the 4000m freestyle and fifth in the 200m backstroke events.

On 6 September 1911, on his 16th attempt, Burgess became the second person to swim across the English Channel, and the first one to use goggles. His motorcycle goggles leaked water, but they protected his eyes from water splashes during his breaststroke-only swim. King George V wrote: "I am commanded to convey to you the hearty congratulations of the King upon your determination and endurance in accomplishing the wonderful feat of swimming the Channel today." Burgess replied: "Your majesty's gracious message has touched me deeply. Its receipt has given me more pleasure than the accomplishment of the feat itself. I am proud to be an Englishman and your subject."

In the 1920s Burgess was hired by the Olympian gold medalist and world record holder Gertrude Ederle, who in 1926, under his guidance, became the first woman to cross the English Channel. Around the same time Burgess bought a summer home at Cap Gris Nez near Calais, as a summer base to train channel swimmers from 1922 to 1934, while his main residence was at Clichy, Paris. In 1941 Burgess was taken prisoner by the Nazis and held in a prison camp Frontstalag 142 in Besançon, France. He was released later the same year.

Burgess died on 5 July 1950, in the Levallois-Perret suburb of Paris, France.

== In popular culture ==
Some authors suggest that Burgess is the inspiration for the Portuguese word "burgesso", a descriptor for people which is used to mean short, heavy and ungainly, or poorly educated, ignorant and rude.

== See also ==
- List of Olympic medalists in water polo (men)
