= Professor Lloyd =

English stunt diver

Professor (Samuel) Lloyd
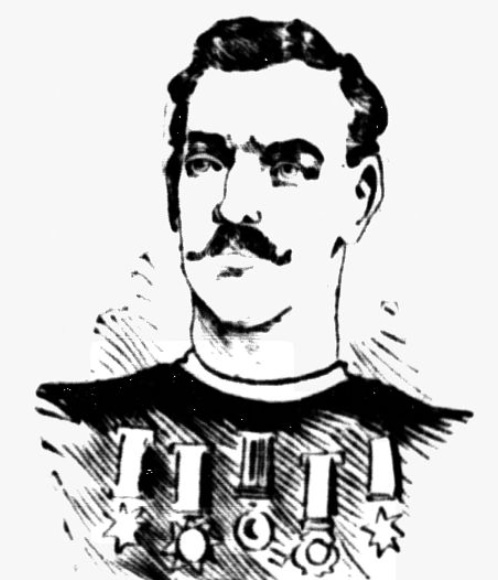
- Drawing of Professor Lloyd
- Born: Samuel Lloyd c.1868 Manchester, United Kingdom
- Died: 23 December 1901 (aged 32–33); Southport, Lancashire, United Kingdom
- Occupations: Stunts man, swim instructor
- Years active: c.1893–1901
- Known for: Stunt diving
- Spouse: Jane Lloyd (m. 1892–1901)
- Children: 2
- Awards: Royal Humane Society parchment certificate (1897)

Samuel Lloyd (c.1868 – c.23 December 1901), professionally known as Professor Lloyd, was an English stunt diver, known for public exhibition diving from heights around the Liverpool area during the late 19th century. Active primarily in north-west England during the 1890s, he became known for performing high dives from railway bridges, piers, aqueducts and moving trains, usually around Liverpool and Southport. He was recognised by the Royal Humane Society, receiving a parchment certificate, for rescuing people from drowning.

In the 1901 United Kingdom census, his occupation was recorded as a "teacher of swimming". Lloyd disappeared during a boating accident off Southport in December 1901 and was presumed to have drowned.

== Early life ==
Samuel Lloyd was born around 1868 in Manchester, United Kingdom. His mother was Frances Lloyd, born in Ireland. He married Jane Clarkson in April 1892, and they had two children, a son and a daughter.

== Career ==
=== Stunt diving ===
Lloyd first appeared in newspaper reports in July 1893, when he dived from nearly 70 feet (21 m) from a temporary platform at Southport Pier into the sea, claiming he would repeat the dive the following week from a height of 100 feet (30 m). At that time, the reported dive height record at the pier was from 79 feet (24 m), set by J. B. Johnson. In September 1893, Lloyd was described as being a daily performer, with his diving being "one of the features of the Pier entertainments".

In early May 1895, Lloyd dived from a moving carriage on the Liverpool Overhead Railway into Collingwood Dock, following a similar dive by fellow stunt diver Tommy Burns. During this period, Lloyd and Burns competed with each other for recognition as a world champion diver. A few weeks later, Lloyd climbed the latticework of Runcorn Railway Bridge and dived 75 feet (23 m) into the water, disguising himself while walking past the ticket office to not cause suspicion.

His repeated use of railway structures brought him into conflict with railway authorities. In June 1895, he was fined 40 shillings plus costs for trespass at Preston's North Union Railway bridge, which he had previous dived from and received a warning not to repeat it, but did so on the day in question. Lloyd defended his actions on the grounds that it was necessary for him to do so to maintain his reputation. The following month, Lloyd arrived in New York City and deposited the equivalent of $1000 with the National Police Gazette, claiming that he would match anyone who wanted to challenge him to a dive off the Brooklyn Bridge, followed by a swim to Ellis Island. He sailed back to Liverpool on 27 July 1895, due to having a prior engagement to dive off the Menai Suspension Bridge in North Wales. Before leaving, he indicated a willingness to dive alone off the Brooklyn Bridge, if there were no suitable challengers and if enough money was staked to make it worthwhile. He was reportedly seriously injured on his chest and face, during a dive off Lytham Pier in August 1895.

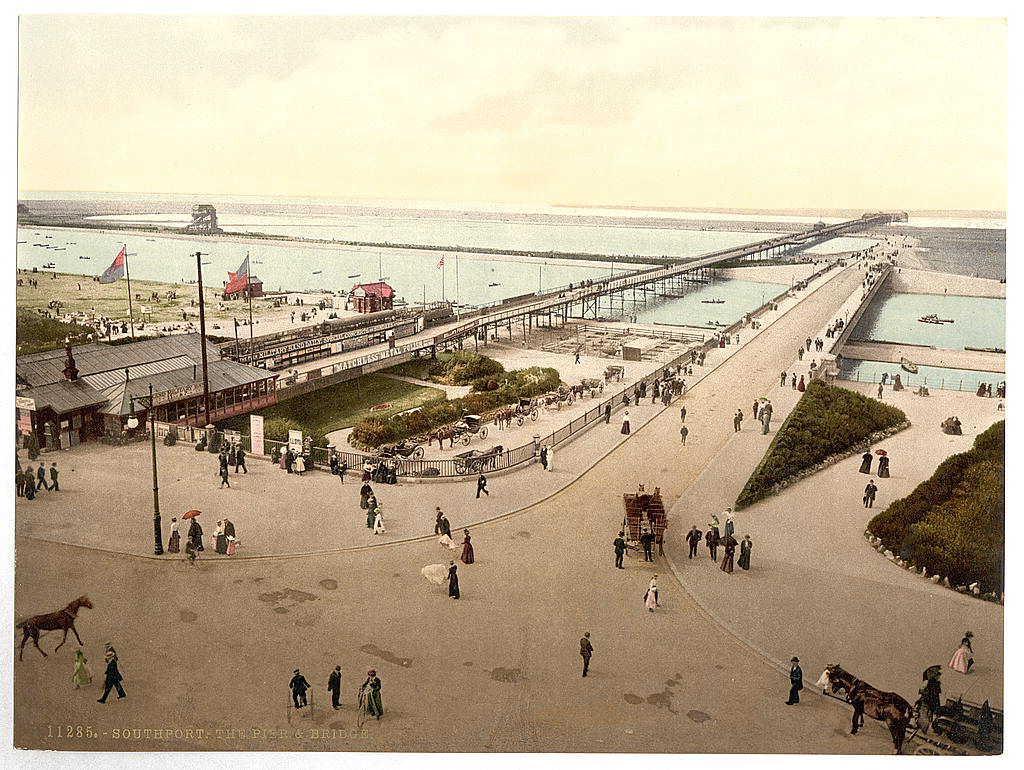
Southport Pier and bridge, sometime between 1890 and 1900

Following the death of Tommy Burns in January 1897, Lloyd planned two diving performances from Southport Pier in July 1897, from a scaffold of 90 feet (27 m), 30 feet (9.1 m) taller than the height which Burns made his fatal dive. The dive was intended to support the family of Burns, whose father and sister had already received donations from another diver, Ted Heaton, towards funeral expenses. The dive took place on 18 July, in front of a crowd of around 3,000 spectators, raising £3. Lloyd also planned to undertake long-distance swimming a few weeks later, also to help raise aid funds. In October 1897, Lloyd dived off Warburton Bridge, a short time after another man attempted the feat and was killed. Police had been keeping watch on the bridge, but arrived too late to prevent the dive, which was witnessed by only several people.

In June 1898, Lloyd returned to Liverpool, with the intention of again diving from a carriage on the Liverpool Overhead Railway. Lloyd's plan was to make his way to the top of the train while in motion and dive 70 feet (21 m) into Collingwood Dock. His attempt was foiled by the presence of a train inspector. After a further unsuccessful attempt, Lloyd succeeded in diving from a moving Liverpool Overhead Railway carriage into Collingwood Dock, despite efforts by railway officials to prevent him. Police initially believed he had attempted suicide, before realising it had been a planned performance, after which they attempted to detain him, but he escaped. Around a similar time, he dived from about 70 feet (21 m) off the Lancaster Aqueduct Bridge into 6 feet (1.8 m) of water, despite three others having died trying the same on previous attempts.

Following a disaster in the Southport channel in June 1899, in which three men drowned attempting to remove a lifeboat, Lloyd gave evidence at the inquest as a witness, which returned a verdict of "accidental death". In early July 1899, he found the 3rd body of John Robinson, lying between two other boats.

He dived off London Bridge on 18 October 1899, fully dressed. The dive had been kept quiet so that it would not attract a large crowd, while only passers by witnessed it. Despite a strong tide, he completed the dive successfully and was retrieved from the water by a waiting boat.

=== Rescues ===
In July 1894, a man bathing near Southport Pier was carried away by the tide and at risk of drowning. Lloyd observed the incident and jumped into the water to save him, to cheers from the nearby crowd. He again rescued a man near Southport Pier in August 1897, who was being carried away by the tide after being ejected from his boat. Lloyd dived in to the water and helped get the man to shore.

In November 1897, he was recognised by the Royal Humane Society in the form of a parchment certificate, for his bravery at Southport Pier in August 1897, when he dived off the pier-head to rescue the man who had fallen overboard from his capsized boat. In accepting the certificate award, Lloyd indicated that he believed he had already saved eleven people up to that point, but that this was the first time it had been recognised by the Royal Humane Society.

== Death ==
Lloyd disappeared on 23 December 1901 after a boat, carrying him and three others returning from a French vessel, was caught by strong tides near Southport. Two surviving occupants, named as Bromley and Cummings, later explained they expected the boat could be swamped and chose to abandon the vessel, eventually making it to shore, where they explained to police that the other two, Samuel Lloyd and John Norman, were left unconscious in the boat. Despite extensive searches, neither man was immediately found. The Manchester Evening News reported on 26 December that hopes of finding the men alive were gone, after their boat was found empty ashore near Hesketh Bank. There was no evidence that it had capsized.

Following the discovery of the body one of the missing men, John Norman, in early January 1902, an inquest was held. The other two men on the boat, Robert Bromley and Arthur Cummings, claimed the mast broke and they struggled in winds. They claimed the boat grounded and that they left Norman and Lloyd in the boat, unconscious. Despite being surrounded by the tide, they eventually reached the shore. The inquest returned an open verdict.

Over the following months, several bodies recovered from the sea were incorrectly speculated to be Lloyd, such as in February and March 1902. It wasn't until 12 August 1903 that remains believed to be his were discovered off Blackpool.

== Aftermath ==
In February 1902, a benefit concert was held, which raised around £100 towards the relief fund for his widow and children.

On 22 March 1902, his widow Jane Lloyd was summoned at a police court for non-payment of rates. She claimed to have not received any money since January, while rate officials stated that although a considerable sum of money was raised for her family, they did not consider it appropriate to spend on rates payment. The following month, Jane was charged with attempted suicide by throwing herself into a lake in Southport. A walker helped pull her from the water, to which her response was "I want to drown! I want to join my husband". She disclosed having financial difficulties, as funds raised following her husband's death were in aid of her children. The case was dropped several days later, after Jane Lloyd apologised and no evidence was submitted by the Chief Constable. Jane Lloyd was listed on the 1911 United Kingdom census as a widowed lodger, working as a charwoman.
