= Samuel Lloyd =

Samuel or Sam Lloyd may refer to:

- Samuel Lloyd (diver) (c1868–1901), English stunt diver
- Samuel T. Lloyd III (born 1950), dean of Washington National Cathedral
- Sam Lloyd (1963–2020), American actor and singer
- Sam Lloyd (footballer) (born 1990), Australian rules footballer for Western Bulldogs, formerly for Richmond

== See also ==
- Sam Loyd (1841–1911), American puzzle author and recreational mathematician
