= Jabez Wolffe =

British swimmer (1876–1943)

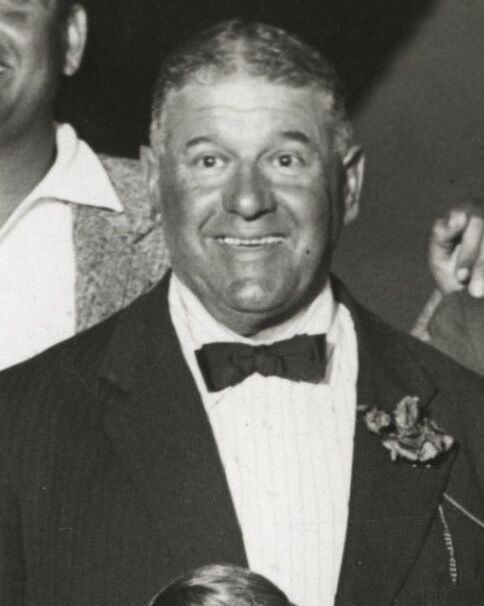
- Jabez Wolffe in 1928

Personal information
- Full name: Jacob Abraham Wolffe
- Born: November 19, 1876 Glasgow, Scotland
- Died: October 22, 1943 (aged 66)

Sport
- Sport: Swimming

Jacob Abraham "Jabez" "Jappy" Wolffe (19 November 1876 – 22 October 1943) was a Scottish long-distance swimmer and author of swimming books. He attempted but failed to swim the English Channel 22 times, between 1906 and 1921. He came closest to success in the September of 1919, with an attempt of 14 hours 55 minutes, from Shakespeare Cliff, Dover, England "to within a quarter of a mile of the French coast". He is also known for the differing historical accounts of his role as a trainer in the first, failed attempt of Gertrude Ederle to swim the channel.

== Biography ==
Born in Glasgow, Scotland, on 19 November 1876 as Jacob Abraham Wolffe, he was generally known by the first name Jabez. He occasionally published as "Jappy Wolffe".

== English Channel cross attempts ==
Among his attempts to cross the channel was one in August 1907, when he made his swim with Ted Heaton and their efforts gradually turned into "something of a race". While both men failed on that occasion, a primary source noted that it was a "fine struggle almost successful", and that Wolffe came "within three quarters of a mile" of the coast when wind drove him away from the shore.

As stated in Wolffe's obituary in The New York Times in 1943,

The nearest he came to attaining his goal was in September of 1919, when he swam from Shakespeare Cliff at Dover to within a quarter of a mile of the French coast in 14 hours 55 minutes.

== Ederle training controversy ==
Gertrude Ederle was an American swimming champion, Olympic champion and record breaker who trained with Wolffe for her first attempt to cross the English Channel to France. Regarding the failed first attempt, the New York Times, in its obituary for Wolffe, states that on returning to the United States, Ederle

issued a statement denying that she had been forced by fatigue and cold to abandon the swim, saying that, instead, Mr. Wolffe had ordered her to quit. Mr. Wolffe denied this, insisting that the swimmer had collapsed after suffering a cramp.

Others state that training with Wolffe prior to the attempt did not go well, as he continually tried to slow her pace, saying that she would never last at that speed. Then, in her first attempt at the Channel on 18 August 1925, she was disqualified when he ordered another swimmer (who was keeping her company in the water), Ishak Helmy, to recover her from the water. According to both Ederle and other witnesses, she was not "drowning" but resting, floating face-down; she bitterly disagreed with his decision. As he had commented that women may not be capable of swimming the Channel, it was speculated that he did not want Ederle to succeed.

Ederle successfully swam the Channel one year later, from Cape Gris-Nez in France to Kingsdown, Kent, in 14 hours and 34 minutes later, after training with coach Bill Burgess.

== Publications ==
- Text-Book of Swimming (1907).
- Swimming Short & Long Distance (1926).
