= Rhyl Pier =

Former pier in Rhyl, Wales

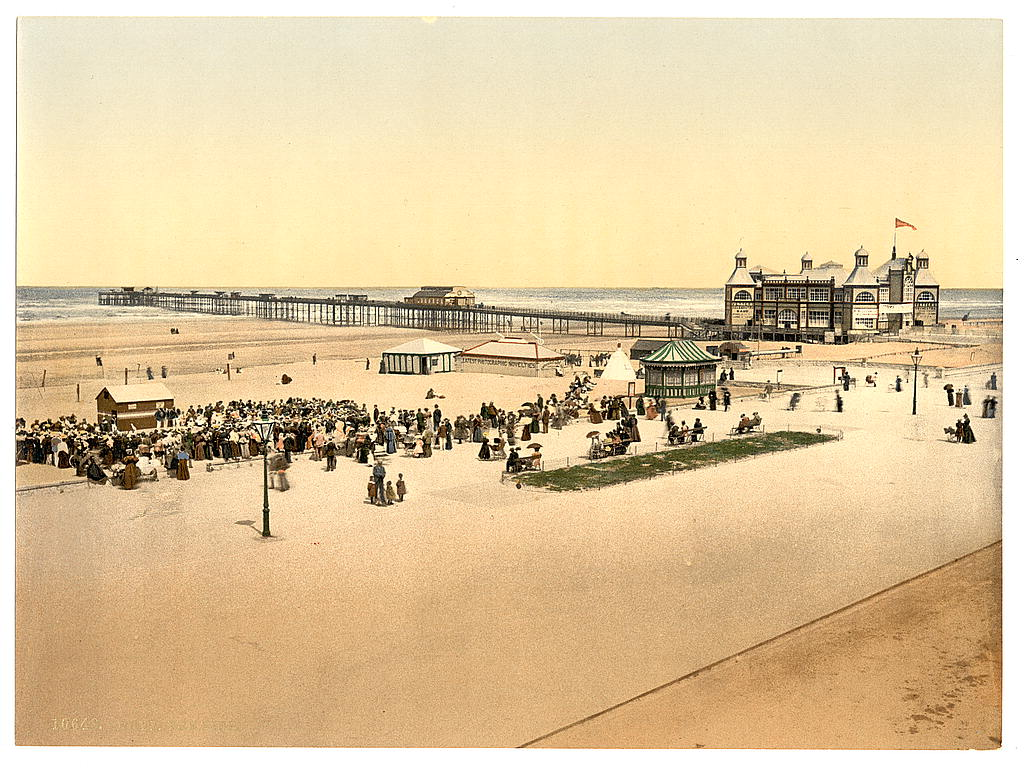
- Type: Pleasure
- Carries: Pedestrians
- Location: Rhyl
- Coordinates: 53.32355°N 3.49211°W

Characteristics
- Total length: 2,355 feet (718 m)

History
- Designer: James Brunlees
- Opening date: 19 August 1867; 158 years ago
- Closure date: 1966; 60 years ago
- Demolition date: March 1973; 53 years ago
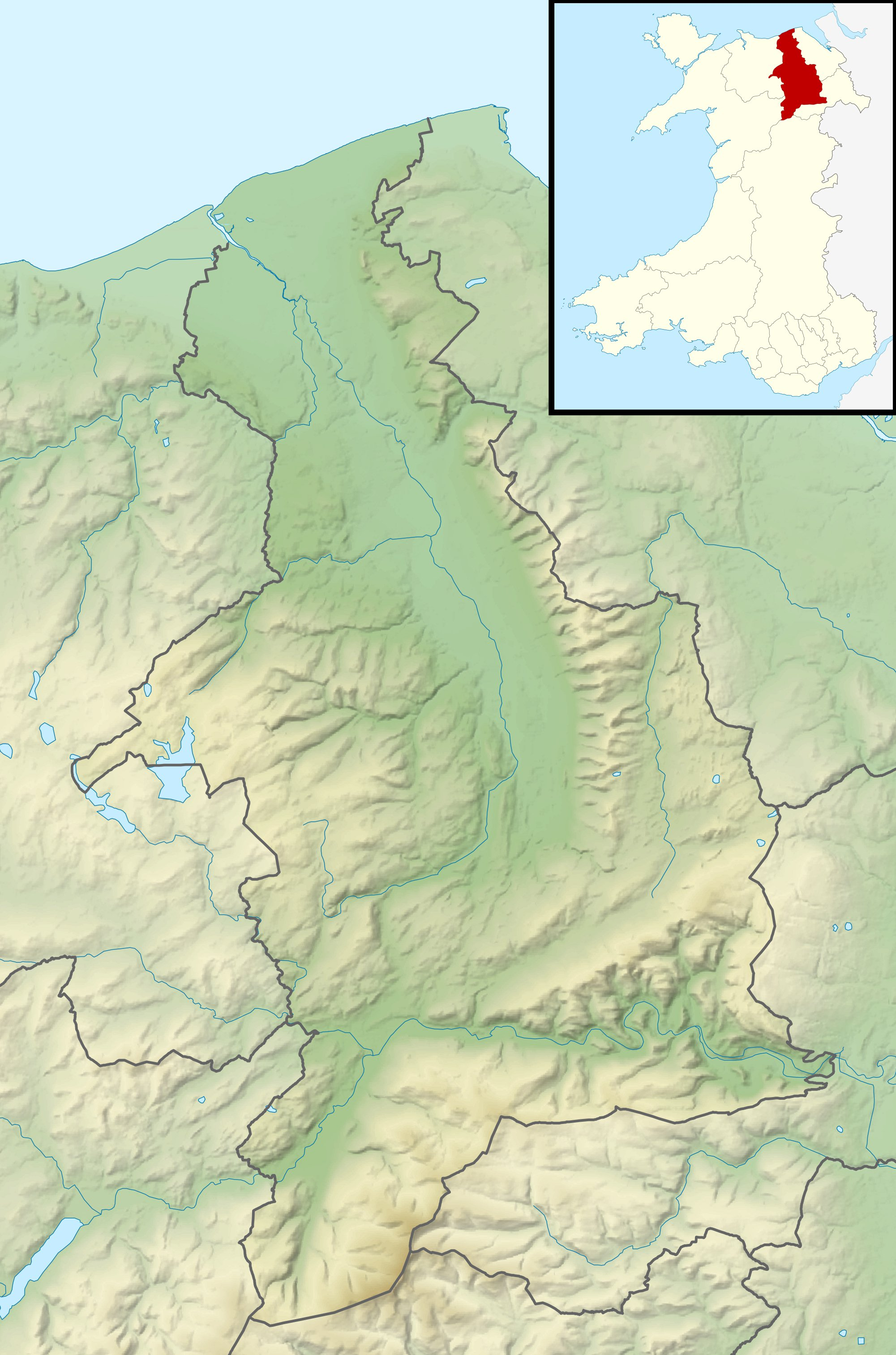
- Location within Denbighshire

Rhyl Pier, officially known as the Victoria Pier, was a pleasure pier in the seaside town of Rhyl, Flintshire, (Note: During the lifespan of the pier, Rhyl was within the boundaries of the historic Welsh county of Flintshire. After the pier was demolished in 1973, Rhyl became part of the preserved county of Clwyd in 1974 and the principal area of Denbighshire in 1996.) and the first to be built in North Wales. Designed by James Brunlees and opened in August 1867 at a length of 2,355 feet (718 m), it was the town's central attraction for the ensuing years. Following dispute and public consultation regarding the location it would be built, the pier was constructed near the centre of the esplanade. The pier's Grand Pavilion, built in 1891, featured the world's largest organ, known as the Grand Jubilee Organ and weighed 25 tonnes (28 short tons).

Several incidents occurred during the pier's lifespan, in particular during the late 19th century of boats crashing into the pier. In 1897, celebrity diver Tommy Burns fatally dived 100 feet (30 m) off the pier, observed by around 3,000 people and was declared dead shortly after being brought out of the sea. The following year in 1898, early filmmaker Arthur Cheetham presented his 'living pictures' to a full audience in the Grand Pavilion.

Following years of dereliction, the pier was purchased by Rhyl Council by auction in 1913 and was operational from the 1930s until the mid-1960s, at which point it was declared unsafe and closed. Despite reports in October 1966 that the council were prepared to consider offers to reconstruct the pier, this did not materialise and it was subsequently demolished in March 1973.

== Location ==
Rhyl Pier was sited on the East Parade, directly opposite Church Street. At the shore end was a Grand Pavilion and Toll Houses. An additional Bijou Pavilion stood just off the shore. Original intentions were for the pier to be built at Kinmel Bay (then known as Foryd), with Victoria Pier Company board members suggesting this location would also facilitate cattle transport as well as a tourist attraction. The decision to build the pier near the centre of the esplanade was reached following disputes and arguments with The Victoria Pier Company, and following community consultation. The pier company chairman, Commissioner John Churton, suggested that a pier built near the town centre, as opposed to Foryd, would require costs of around £25,000 (equivalent to £3,088,900 in 2024) compared to £15,000 (equivalent to £1,853,300 in 2024) for a pier at Foryd.

== History ==
=== Planning ===
A pier in Rhyl was first proposed during the mid-19th century, when the arrival of the Chester and Holyhead Railway in 1848 helped promote Rhyl as a popular seaside resort. Steamboats bringing visitors to Rhyl needed to use the Foryd Harbour, although this was not always available depending upon the tides. In 1862, the Rhyl Promenade Pier and Assembly Room Company (shortly after renamed to the Rhyl Promenade Pier Company) was formed with the purpose of providing a pier and landing stage for steamers on the promenade. The proposal for a cattle-traffic pier to be built in the west end of the town was passed, when it dawned on many board members that instead of pleasure boat traffic, there would be cattle boat traffic that could potentially block the port. Petitions and passionate speeches by Lord Richard Grosvenor and Richard Rowley MP helped get the bill thrown out. Residents of Rhyl claimed the pier scheme had been "forced upon them", which was a similar conclusion Lord Grosvenor determined when he ascertained the extent of local support, suggesting local people felt the original pier proposal "would be of no use to them".

After revised plans were put to the board, a public meeting was held to ascertain the feelings of the local population and determine support for a new pier near the town centre. The community response was generally in support for a pier at the centre of the esplanade. On 10 October 1863, the foreshore for the site of the proposed pier was leased by the Crown, with a provisional order for construction, the Rhyl Promenade Pier Order 1864 granted in January 1864 and royal assent for the Pier and Harbour Orders Confirmation Act 1864 (27 & 28 Vict. c. 93) gained in July later that year.

Due to conditions of the tide, a longer pier was deemed necessary to allow steamers to call at low tide. James Brunlees, an engineer who had designed Southport Pier, drew up plans to construct a 3,168 feet (966 m) long pier, to consist of cast iron piles with wooden decking. The pier would be 11 feet (3.4 m) above the high-water level and 16 feet (4.9 m) wide, with seats and shelters running the length of both sides.

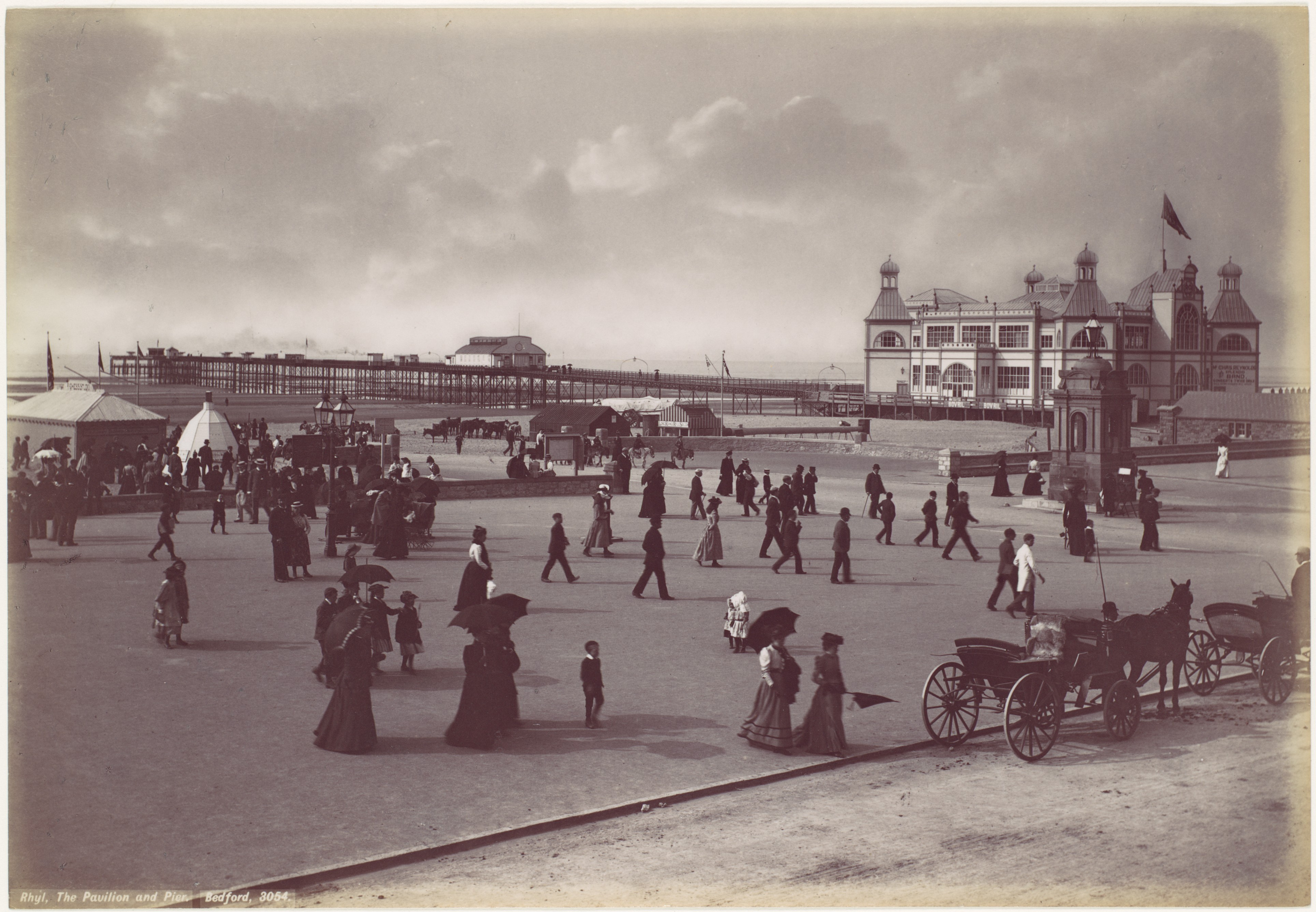

=== Construction ===
The first foundation stone was laid on 25 May 1866 by Peter Ellis Eyton MP. By September 1866, 1,500 feet (460 m) of pier had been built until a storm on 11 September 1866 destroyed around 900 feet (270 m). The engineer, James Brunlees, was blamed for design faults and was replaced by R. D. Morgan, who redesigned the pier to be a further 7 feet (2.1 m) taller, albeit at a shorter overall length of 2,250 feet (690 m). The shorter length meant that steamboats would only be able to visit during medium and high tides. Many difficulties were experienced during the pier's construction, with the most disastrous set back washing away the first part of the structure, caused by rough sea conditions.

=== Operation ===
The Victoria Pier opened on 19 August 1867 at a length of around 2,355 feet (718 m) and cost around £15,000 (equivalent to £1,853,300 in 2024), although reports from the time suggested it may have been around £17,000. Crowds from as far as Liverpool and Manchester gathered for the opening, as well as visitors from local districts, to see the pier officially opened. A steamboat named Columbus was docked just off-shore and fired cannons at intervals. It was the first pier to be built in North Wales and became a productive asset to Rhyl, with excursions from Liverpool and other Welsh seaside resorts. An extension to the pier opened in May 1880 at an average estimated cost of £2500 (equivalent to £347,500 in 2024).

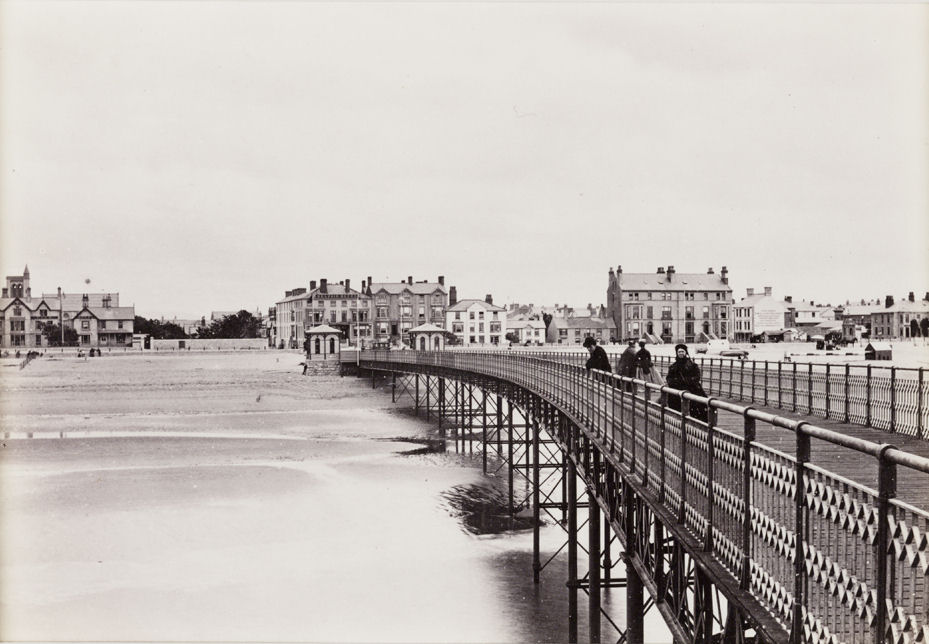
View from the pier, c1880

The pier was purchased in 1891 by the Rhyl Pier and Pavilion Company, who in June 1891 starting work on building a Grand Pavilion at the entrance. Original designs featured a large dome that ultimately was never constructed. The new Grand Pavilion was opened on 12 September 1891 by Lady Fiorentia Hughes, having taken just 14 weeks to erect and capable of holding around 3000 people. At the time, the pavilion featured the world's largest organ, known as the Grand Jubilee Organ, at a weight of 25 tons and complete with 3095 pipes. The new additions to the pier cost around £6,000 (equivalent to £834,000 in 2024).

In 1893, a lifeguard station was added. Early film maker Arthur Cheetham presented his 'living pictures' to a full audience in the Grand Pavilion in 1898 and by the following year, pier attractions included a water carnival, diving competitions and greasy poll walking. Despite improvements, owners the Rhyl Pier and Pavilion Company had lost money for each year the pier was under their ownership. The mortgage holders Greenhalgh and Geary were owed £15,303 (equivalent to £2,126,700 in 2024) and ownership passed to them in 1896.

==== Change of ownership ====
On 10 January 1898, the pier was purchased by Messrs Carter and Warhurst of Manchester, of who the latter had been a former director of the previous owning company. The pair took on the £4,100 (equivalent to £569,900 in 2024) mortgage, calling themselves the Victoria Pier and Pavilion Company. Around this time, the pier was reported on safety grounds to the Board of Trade, who found it to be generally safe, however when rechecked in 1900, was found to have rotten decking and numerous supporting piles that were out of perpendicular. In August 1900, the pier's west side was declared unsafe and out of bounds, while all attractions at the pier head were prohibited. However, when inspected by Mr A Gillespie, who was also a manager of the firm that constructed the pier, he remarked that he found the supporting piles to be free of corrosion and rigid, suggesting that the under structure showed evidence of having been cared for. He disagreed with the previous conclusion that the roadway was dangerous and believed it was not necessary to close any part of it. In late 1901, a "powerful syndicate of Manchester gentlemen" purchased the pier, beating Rhyl Council who were also in negotiations, with intentions upon extending the structure and building a pavilion. On the basis of the earlier safety report, repair work followed and the pier was allowed to fully reopen in 1902.

==== Renewal and extension proposals ====
In October 1905, it was reported that an enlargement scheme for the pier, by then nearly 40 years old, was likely to go ahead. The pier was considered to have not kept pace with the town, which was described as having developed "in a very gratifying manner". A key drawback for the pier was that boats could not dock at low tide, which hindered the town's ability to encourage visitors regardless of the tidal state. The scheme proposed widening the pier by 20 feet (6.1 m) to 36 feet (11 m), while a proposed extension would be 14 feet (4.3 m) wide and at a permanent depth of at least 9 feet (2.7 m). It was hoped that the scheme would be initiated within six months of the report, to be ready by June 1906. In May 1906, it was reported that the scheme would not be completed for that season and that it was "a long was off realisation".

=== Decline ===
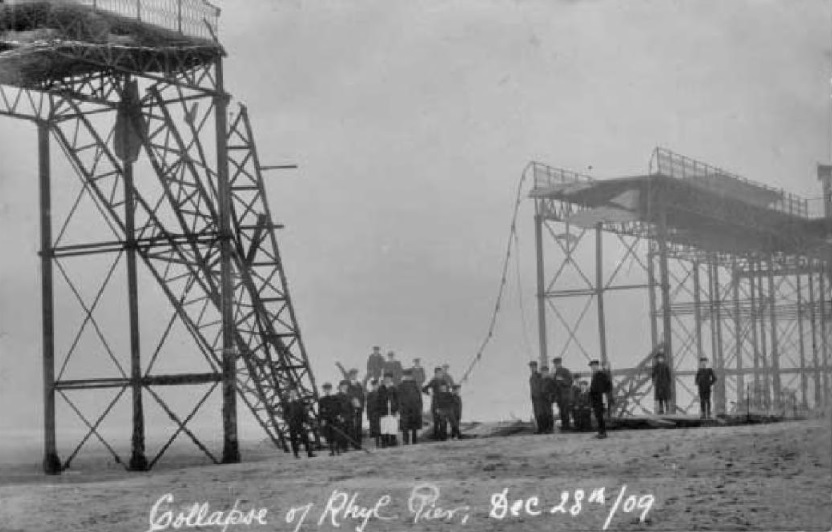
Collapse of Rhyl Pier, December 1909

Following storm damage in the early hours of 29 December 1909, around 30 yards (27 m) of pier was washed away from the point where a steamboat had collided around 25 years prior. By 1913, the pier was declared unsafe and listed for sale. Rhyl Urban District Council purchased the derelict pier on 25 February 1913 at a public auction for £1,000 (equivalent to £123,600 in 2024), with the decision to purchase unanimously supported by the Rhyl Ratepayers' Association during its monthly meeting at the end of the month. The council vice-chairman praised the members in keeping the purchase a secret, as news of the purchase was not known outside of the council chamber.

Having remained derelict since 1912, work started on the pier's reconstruction in July 1927 and the reopening was announced in February 1930. Among the entertainment on the pier during the mid-20th century was acrobat James Evans, known as "Swinging Jim" on account of him revolving around a 30 feet (9.1 m) vertical bar and was a popular act with pier visitors.

The pier had reopened following redevelopment of the shore end and demolition of the seaward section, yet by April 1966, numerous councilors were calling for it to be closed, but were defeated in their efforts, although the surveyor was afforded power to close the pier "whenever he thought it necessary". The pier subsequently did close to the public in 1966 on safety grounds, at that time measuring just 330 feet (100 m) in length. In October that year, it was reported the council were prepared to consider offers to reconstruct the pier in keeping with the promenade's character. The council had reportedly agreed that the coastguard may use the pier at their "own risk", although a lone coastguard on watch one day was unaware of this apparent agreement or that they were using it at risk. Reconstruction ultimately did not materialise and the pier was demolished in March 1973. Shortly after, various lengths of pine pier timber, ranging from 10–35 feet (3.0–10.7 m), were made available for sale by Hughes & Son in Conwy at 5 pence per foot.

== Disasters ==
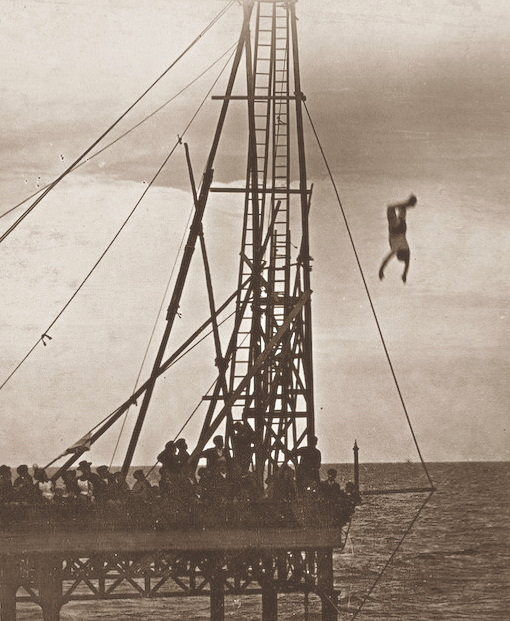
Tommy Burns' fatal dive in 1897

Several boats crashed in to the pier during its early existence. In December 1883, a schooner crashed into the pier during a gale, taking with it 120–150 feet (37–46 m) of pier. The following year, a steamboat also crashed into the pier during a storm.

During work to build a large pavilion at the entrance, a vessel named Fawn hit the pier on 31 August 1891. The boat typically carried passengers and cargo to and from Liverpool. When the boat hit the pier, fifty passengers needed rescuing by lifeboat. Shortly after on 13 October 1891, a heavy storm pulled an iron seat from its fastenings and damaged a shelter. Later that decade in July 1897, celebrity diver Tommy Burns dived 100 feet (30 m) into the sea, watched by around 3,000 spectators. He was then seen struggling to swim the 800 feet (240 m) back to the shore and when aided by swimmers, he was found to be unconscious upon being brought up to the pier. Despite trying for 20 minutes, the coastguard were unable to save him and he was declared dead.

In 1901, the Grand Pavilion was destroyed by a fire which also closed part of the structure. Later that decade on 28 December 1909, a 90 feet (27 m) section of pier collapsed due to a weak supporting pile, the same section that was hit by a vessel some years prior. Less than two years later on 30 August 1911, a further fire occurred in one of the pier shops.

== New pier proposal ==
In 2010, plans were under consideration to construct a new pier in Rhyl that would have tidal energy creating capabilities, as part of a multi-million pound project. Securing finances for the project was doubted and ultimately did not materialise.
