= Ted Heaton =

British diver

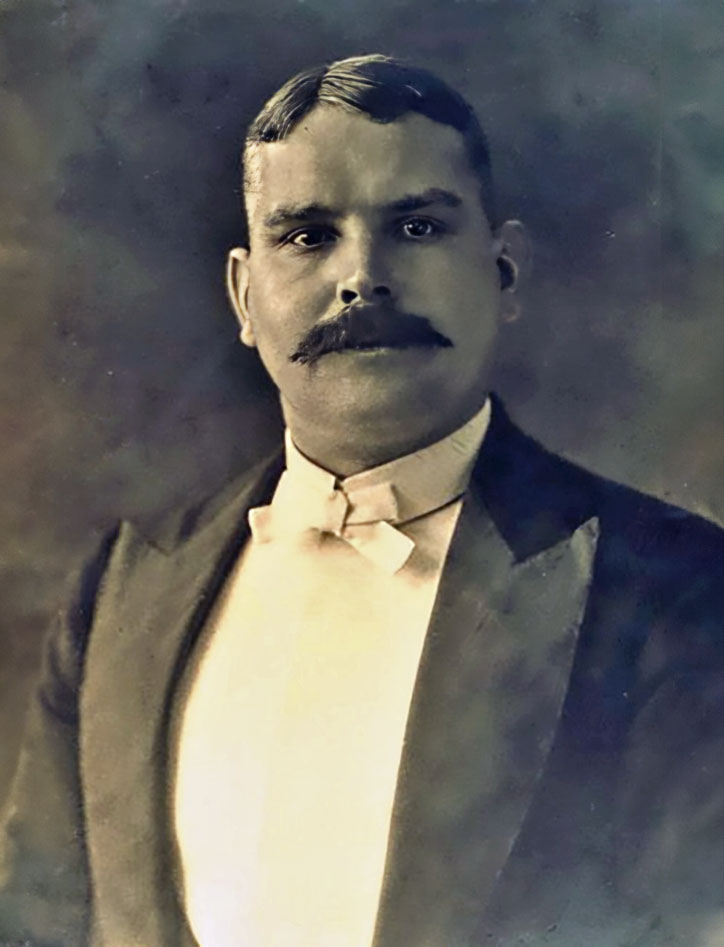
- Heaton c. 1910

Personal information
- Full name: Edmund Caunce Nowell Heaton
- Born: 1872 Liverpool, England
- Died: 19 September 1937 (aged 64–65) Southport, Lancashire, England
- Resting place: Allerton Cemetery, Liverpool
- Height: 5 ft 9.5 in (1.765 m)
- Weight: 13 st 8 lb (86 kg; 190 lb)
- Spouse(s): Elizabeth Emery (m. 1890–1892) Julia Rolling (m. 1893; suicide 1927)

Sport
- Country: Great Britain
- Sport: Diving, Swimming

Edmund Caunce Nowell 'Ted' Heaton (late 1872 – 19 September 1937) was a British diver and swimming instructor born in Liverpool, England. He is notable for his small tank diving displays during the late 19th century and for his several unsuccessful attempts to swim the English Channel during the early 20th century. Having begun training to swim the channel in 1893, he made a total of seven attempts. He often came within several miles of the French coast, with the closest being in August 1909 when he came within 2 miles (3.2 km). His swimming efforts earned him a role as a superintendent of his local swimming baths and a salary of £120 a year which also included accommodation and energy provision.

Heaton undertook army service during World War I, by joining the Sportsmen's Battalions in 1916 given he was several years too old to enlist ordinarily. He served with the Royal Fusiliers at Dover as a sergeant-instructor to prepare them for trench warfare and even did duty at a prisoner camp in India, before being discharged in 1919 on grounds of disability due to gallstones. He was employed as a swimming pool attendant on transatlantic passenger ships, notably the RMS Carinthia during 1928 to 1929. In the early 1930s as superintendent and swimming instructor at his swimming baths, he devised a swimming tuition system to allow school students to enter the water simultaneously, which utilised wood floats and canvas webs and upon catching the attention of Poland's Director of Education, was reviewed favourably.

He was married twice, firstly to Elizabeth who died just two years later, while his second wife Julia committed suicide in 1927. He had three children to his second wife, two sons and a daughter. During his later life, he advertised himself as a swimming instructor at his Cornwallis Street baths. He died in September 1937 while on a visit to the seaside town of Southport.

== Early life ==
Heaton was born in the fourth quarter of 1872. His father, Edward Heaton, was a book-keeper for Liverpool Docks. He trained as a printer's compositor, and worked in the profession irregularly before becoming a professional swimmer around the 1890s.

== Swimming and diving ==
=== 19th century ===
Heaton's early career was focused on circus acts and tank diving. One early feat reportedly took place at a Birkenhead circus, where in early 1896 he was reported to have dived 50 feet (15 m) into a 3 feet 6 inches (1.07 m) tank at Ohmy's Grand New Circus. He wrote to The Era in May 1896, after they erroneously stated that Professor Bracken held the unique position as a small tank champion high diver. Heaton disputed the statement, stating that he was the originator of small tank diving, having performed it at all the circuses and noting he was "the only small tank diver". Following the death of fellow high diver Tommy Burns in July 1897, Heaton organised a charity dive from Rhyl Pier to help raise money for the family to pay for the funeral costs, and he sent them the sum of £3 and 10 shillings from the proceeds. His charity performance in the evening was observed by over 2,000 people on the pier and 10,000 on the beach, where he dived, according to Heaton himself, with his body in flames.

In January 1898, he dived into Belfast harbour from a specially constructed 50 feet (15 m) high platform at Queens Bridge, witnessed by around 15,000 spectators. Diving into a water tank that was "only 42 inches (1.1 m) deep", it was described as being a "great sensational dive". The following month, having been growing in popularity, he was engaged to perform a dive at the Cirque Raney, in Lyon, France, from a 50 ft height while enveloped in flames, into a tank measuring just 16 feet (4.9 m) by 10 feet (3.0 m). At the Scottish Zoo in September 1898, he was "a capital hit" when secured to perform a 50 feet (15 m) dive into a small water tank just 42 inches (1.1 m) deep, while "enveloped in flames from a large number of fireworks". His performance drew a big audience to the zoo.

=== 20th century ===
Heaton would sometimes combine swimming and diving into a single event, such as in June 1905 when he swam 10 miles (16 km) from Eastham to New Brighton, where the climax was diving off New Brighton Pier.

During the 1900s, he made several unsuccessful attempts to swim the English Channel. Despite reportedly first training for the feat back in 1893, his first attempt was in July 1905 and reportedly started well. He entered the water at 7:41am and swam the breaststroke at pace, experiencing fine and sunny weather conditions. His attempt was alongside Annette Kellerman, who also attempted to swim the channel at the same time, but she left the water 5–6 miles (8.0–9.7 km) out due to sea-sickness. Despite swimming through strong currents, Heaton stopped at 2:30pm in a state of sickness, six miles from the shore, having to abandon his efforts due to swallowing a mouthful of oil.

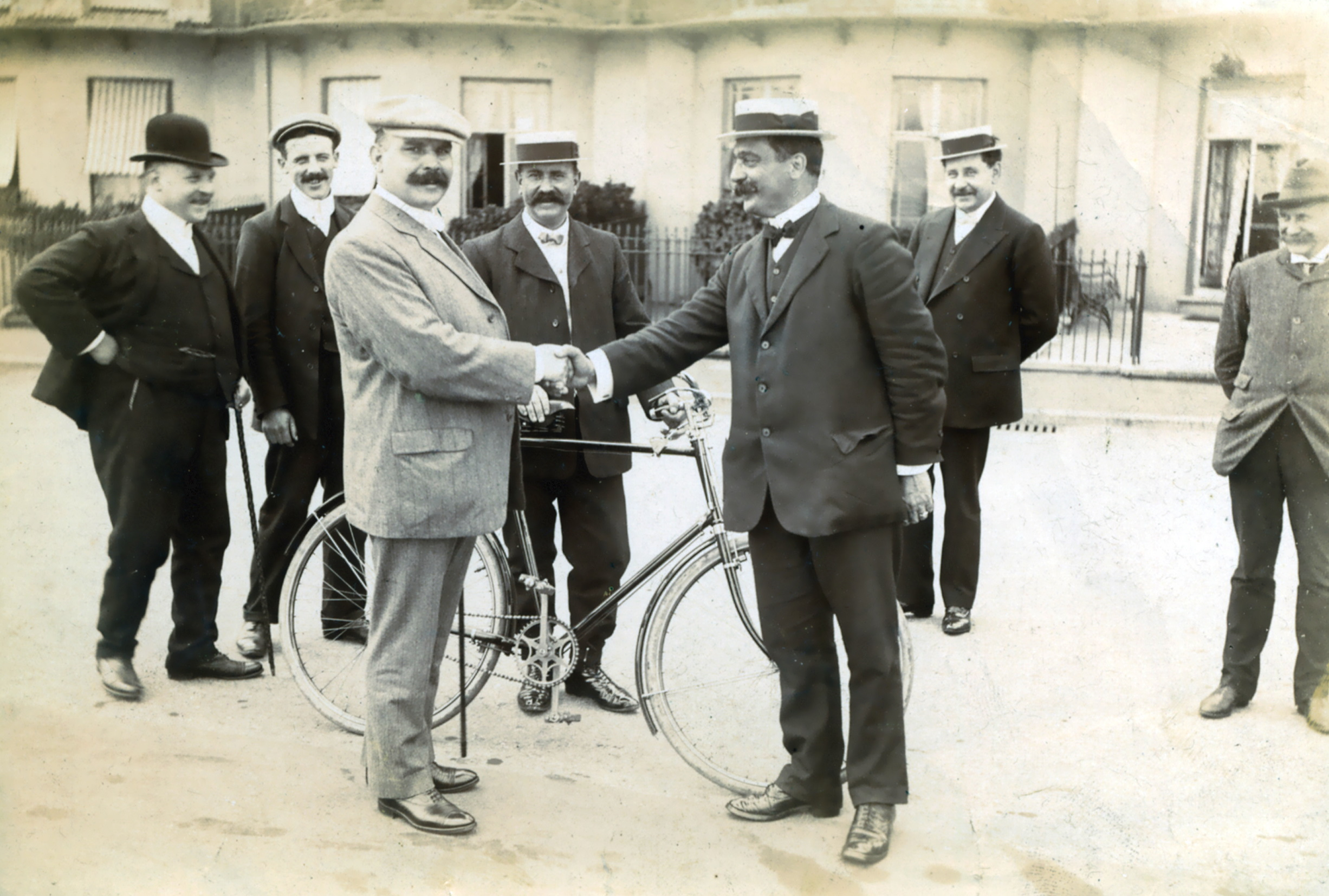
Monty Holbein and Ted Heaton shaking hands at Dover seafront, 1907

After undergoing vigorous training, Heaton prepared for another attempt to cross the channel in 1907. In late June, he attempted to beat the Wallasey ferryboat on the New Brighton to Egremont service, which was met with great interest from the boat's passengers. Despite not beating the ferryboat, which completed the journey in 20 minutes, Heaton swam the journey in just under 28 minutes, followed by a "brisk walk" along the beach. Two months later in early August, he made another attempt to cross the channel, this time with Jabez Wolffe. He started his swim at 8:55 am and was 4 miles (6.4 km) away from land by 11 am. The conditions were described as calm, with some fog haze caused by the heat which developed into something denser. Conditions for the next hour were described as unpleasant, until a light wind cleared the fog. As the swim developed into something resembling a race between the two swimmers, the weather turned around 2:30 pm with a darker sky that developed into a thunderstorm. Once this passed, the swimmers continued in their efforts, although due to a thick haze, the boats supporting Heaton lost sight of him for a time. Unable to see the coast and with no goal visible, he chose to give up his attempt despite being in fine physical condition, noting that another attempt would be made when the tides were next suitable. He made a fourth attempt several weeks later but left the water after just three hours of swimming due to choppy waters. In August 1909 on his fifth attempt, he reached within 1.75 miles (2.82 km) of the French coast but adverse tides forced him to give up, having been in the water for over 15 hours by that time.

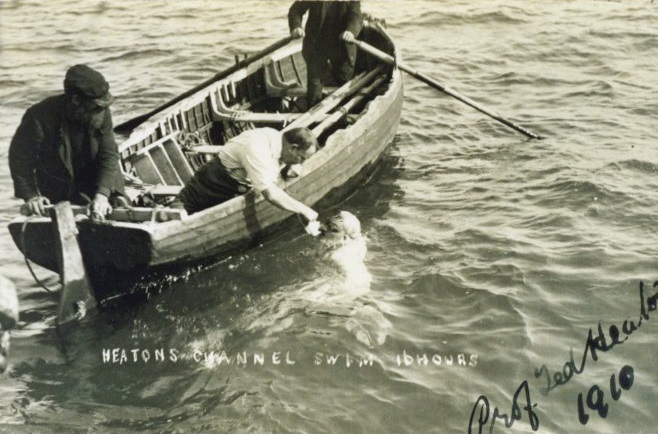
Jack Weidman feeding Heaton on his 1910 channel swim

In early September 1910, he again unsuccessfully attempted to swim the English Channel, coming within four miles of the French shore and being retrieved from the channel in an exhausted state having spent sixteen hours in the water. Despite being a cold night, he continued with his swim but began showing signs of weakness as midnight approached, ultimately giving up on his effort at around 1:21am.

On his seventh and what would be his final attempt to swim the Channel during August 1911, he swam in a warm sea with just a slight breeze. Heaton entered the water around 8:20 am from the supporting boat which was also carrying his wife. Around an hour after entering the water, the wind increased and after over 10 hours swimming at 6:40 pm, abandoned his effort and returned to Dover. He came to within 5 miles (8.0 km) of the French coast.

== Outside competitive sport ==
=== World War I volunteer ===
In late 1914, Heaton joined the Sportsmen's Battalions of London, after being unable to enlist ordinarily due to exceeding the age limit by three years. During the early stages of World War I, he became a prime mover in the Liverpool Volunteer Athletic Corps and felt he wanted to be associated with strenuous wartime activities. Around the start of 1916, he was transferred to the Royal Fusiliers at Dover as a sergeant-instructor, where he was reported in February 1916 to be preparing them for trench warfare and two months later in April, had travelled to India to do duty in a 3000-strong prisoner camp in Rajputana, noting that he did not find the work or climate too taxing on his health. Having served in the military later during the war in the Essex Regiment, he was discharged in December 1919 on disability grounds due to gallstones.

=== Superintendent and instructor ===
In August 1905, Heaton was appointed by an overwhelming majority as the superintendent of Cornwallis Street baths, earning a salary of £120 (equivalent to £16,700 in 2024) a year despite a councillor opposing the appointment on the basis that his "only recommendation was his attempt to swim the channel". The benefits of the role, which he secured from among a number of applicants, included a house, coal and gas and could rise to £150 (equivalent to £20,900 in 2024) per annum. He also found employment as a swimming pool attendant on transatlantic passenger ships, notably the RMS Carinthia from 1928, with an expected length of service lasting for one year. He returned to Liverpool in mid-1929 and resumed swimming instruction at his Cornwallis Street baths.

During his later years, he advertised himself as a swimming instructor, having been known to teach swimming to school children. In order to assist lessons among groups of students, he devised his own system of wood floats and canvas webs which allowed students to enter the water at a specific depth and familiarise themselves with the concept of buoyancy. The device allowed entire classes to be taken into the water simultaneously, whereas previously it was limited to one at a time. Heaton was inspired by a conversation he had with Lord Wavertree, who remarked on the slow speed of class swimming tuition. The device caught the attention of Poland's Director of Education, who upon witnessing use of the apparatus, expressed amazement at its simplicity. He promoted himself in 1932 as "Liverpool's famous swimming master".

== Personal life ==
Heaton reportedly measured 5 feet 9.5 inches (1.765 m) in height and weighed 13 stone 8 pounds (86 kg; 190 lb) around the time he first started training in 1893 to swim the English Channel. His first marriage was to Elizabeth Emery in May 1890, but she died two years later. He married Julia Rolling on 4 December 1893 at St Peter's Church, Liverpool and they had two sons, Edmund James Whittaker (b. c1894), Regnialan (b. c1905) and a daughter, Ellen (b. c1896). According to the 1901 census, he had a younger brother Thomas Heaton, 16 years his junior who was living with him at the time. His daughter Ellen won third prize during a competitive swimming event for ladies in 1913 at Hoylake that was officiated by Heaton. His eldest son became incapacitated with frostbite while serving with the Scottish in trenches on the Western Front during World War I, ultimately being treated in Fazakerley Hospital.

His father was Edward Whittaker Heaton and was listed as a widower living with his son's family during the 1911 census. He died in 1915 at the age of 71 after being knocked down by a taxicab, dying from concussion. Heaton's wife Julia served in Bombay as a Voluntary Aid Detachment nurse during World War I, having served in the role in Liverpool for around a year. In 1927, she committed suicide after swallowing poison whilst of unsound mind. He was known to have a friendship with cricketer Frank Sugg.

He died on 19 September 1937 in Southport General Infirmary while on a visit to the seaside town, leaving effects worth £135, 2 shillings and 1 penny (equivalent to £10,000 in 2024). He was buried at Allerton Cemetery on 22 September 1937. Heaton was still active as an instructor shortly before his death, with advertisements in local press just weeks before he died.
