= Allerton Cemetery =

Municipal cemetery in Allerton, Liverpool, England

Coordinates: 53.360°N 2.879°W

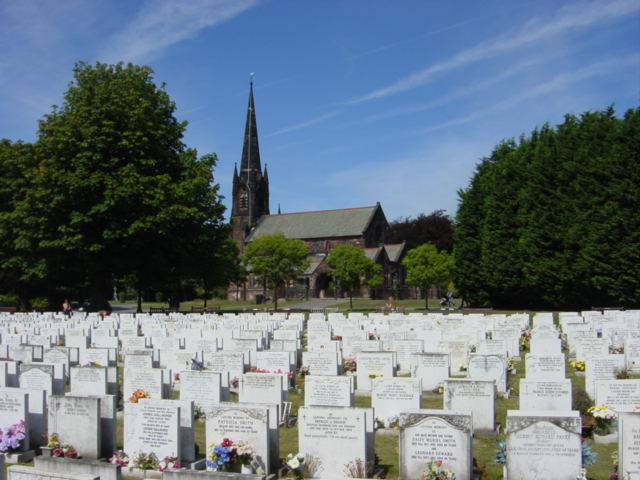
- Interactive map of Allerton Cemetery

Details
- Established: 1909
- Location: Allerton, Liverpool
- Country: England
- Type: Public
- Owned by: Liverpool City Council
- Size: 150 acres
- No. of graves: 74,109

Allerton Cemetery is a cemetery in Allerton, Liverpool, England. The cemetery, of 150 acres (61 ha), is one of the main burial sites for the Metropolitan Borough of Liverpool and is Grade II listed. Springwood Crematorium is situated opposite the cemetery on Springwood Avenue. Purchase of the land for the cemetery was completed in October 1906, the Church of England section was consecrated by the Bishop of Liverpool on 24 September 1909, and the first burial in the cemetery took place on 29 December 1909. It is still in operation.

== Burials ==
In August 2003 the total number of burials was 74,109. Burials by religion:

- Church of England 35,596
- General Nonconformist 18,024
- Roman Catholic 15,072
- Jewish 5,397
- Muslim 20

The cemetery contains graves of 415 Commonwealth services personnel from both World Wars.

Notable individuals buried here include:

- Cilla Black (died 2015), singer and television presenter.
- Ken Dodd (died 2018), comedian.
- Ted Heaton (died 1937), Channel swimmer.
- Julia Lennon (died 1958), mother of Beatle John Lennon.
- George Nurse (died 1945), decorated with the Victoria Cross in the Second Boer War.
- Private William Ratcliffe (died 1963), decorated with the Victoria Cross in World War I.

As a result of investigations into the unauthorised retention of organs, starting on 5 August 2004 the bodies of 50 nameless babies stored for medical research at Liverpool hospitals were buried at Allerton Cemetery. Alder Hey Children's Hospital accounted for seven of the unnamed while the rest came from other hospitals. Further burials took place until 2013.

== Full Earth Woodland Burials ==
Allerton Cemetery has a natural woodland burial area. This provides an alternative to the traditional type of burial area as it offers an area with mature trees and a variety of natural plants and grasses. Graves are excavated to accommodate one full earth burial, so as not to damage tree roots. An adjacent grave may be purchased in reserve where family members wish to be buried together.

Burials in this area can only take place in biodegradable coffins. The grave is marked with an inscribed marker with an inscription being chosen by family members. This is as opposed to traditional headstones, which are not permitted in the woodland area.

The principle behind the natural burial option is to provide an environmentally friendly alternative. It is not intended to reuse the graves in future. Families can therefore be assured that at no point will the remains be disturbed.
