= Tommy Burns (diver) =

British diver

Thomas "Tommy" Burns
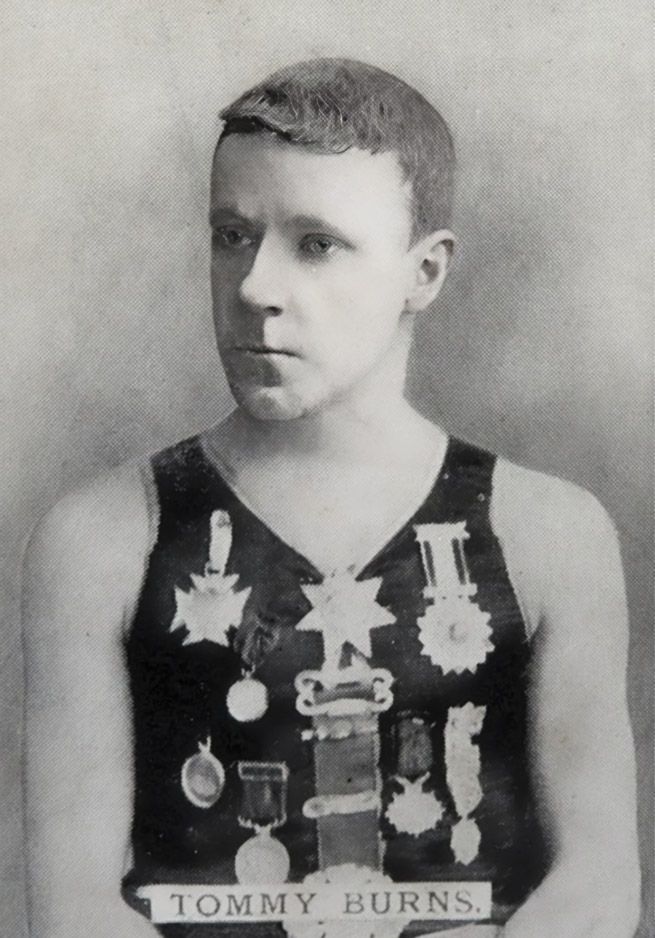
- Tommy Burns on an 'Ogdens Cigarettes' card, printed c. 1901

Personal information
- Born: January 21, 1868 Liverpool, England
- Died: July 6, 1897 (aged 29) Rhyl, Wales
- Resting place: West Derby, Liverpool
- Years active: 1880s–1897
- Height: 5.5 ft (1.7 m)
- Weight: 11 st 4 lb (72 kg; 158 lb)
- Spouse: Marie Burns

Sport
- Country: Great Britain
- Sport: Diving

Thomas "Tommy" Burns (21 January 1868 – 6 July 1897) was a British diver born in Liverpool, England, known for his diving feats and athletic abilities. He advertised himself as the "champion all round athlete of the world," excelling particularly in diving and swimming. Throughout the late 19th century, he gained notoriety for diving off structures, usually bridges such as London Bridge and Clifton Suspension Bridge in England and the Tay Bridge in Scotland.

His diving attempts were often thwarted by police and he sometimes faced arrest upon returning to dry land. On some occasions, he used creative disguises, even dressing as a woman while diving from Trafford Bridge in Manchester. Burns was also known to be a life saver and during his lifetime, is believed to have saved in excess of 40 lives, holding every medal and certificate from the Royal Humane Society. Throughout the 1890s, he travelled the country to showcase his diving, often gaining media attention. In late 1890, he drew attention by jumping off a bridge in Glasgow before a crowd of 22,000 spectators and managed to evade waiting police.

In July 1897, Burns dived off Rhyl Pier in front of an audience of 3,000 people, which ended with him landing heavily on his back and struggling to swim to shore. Some observed that he looked to have been drinking alcohol prior to the dive. Swimmers helped him onto the pier, where he was unconscious and declared dead after 20 minutes of attempted resuscitation. At this time, he was destitute and his coffin was provided by Rhyl Pier, while another professional diver helped to raise funds for his widow by diving off the Rhyl Pier as Burns himself had done.

Although Burns had been drinking alcohol excessively before the dive, the jury of the inquest returned a verdict of accidental drowning.

== Early life ==
Thomas Burns was born in Liverpool on 21 January 1868, though some sources say 1866 or 1867. His family were Irish and his father was a baker. Spending most of his life in Widnes, the family lived in Midwood Street and as a child, he attended St Bedes School in Appleton. Reports from 1884 suggested that by this time, Tommy was a baker and living in Exmouth Street, while being captain of the Sefton Swimming Club.

== Career ==
=== England ===
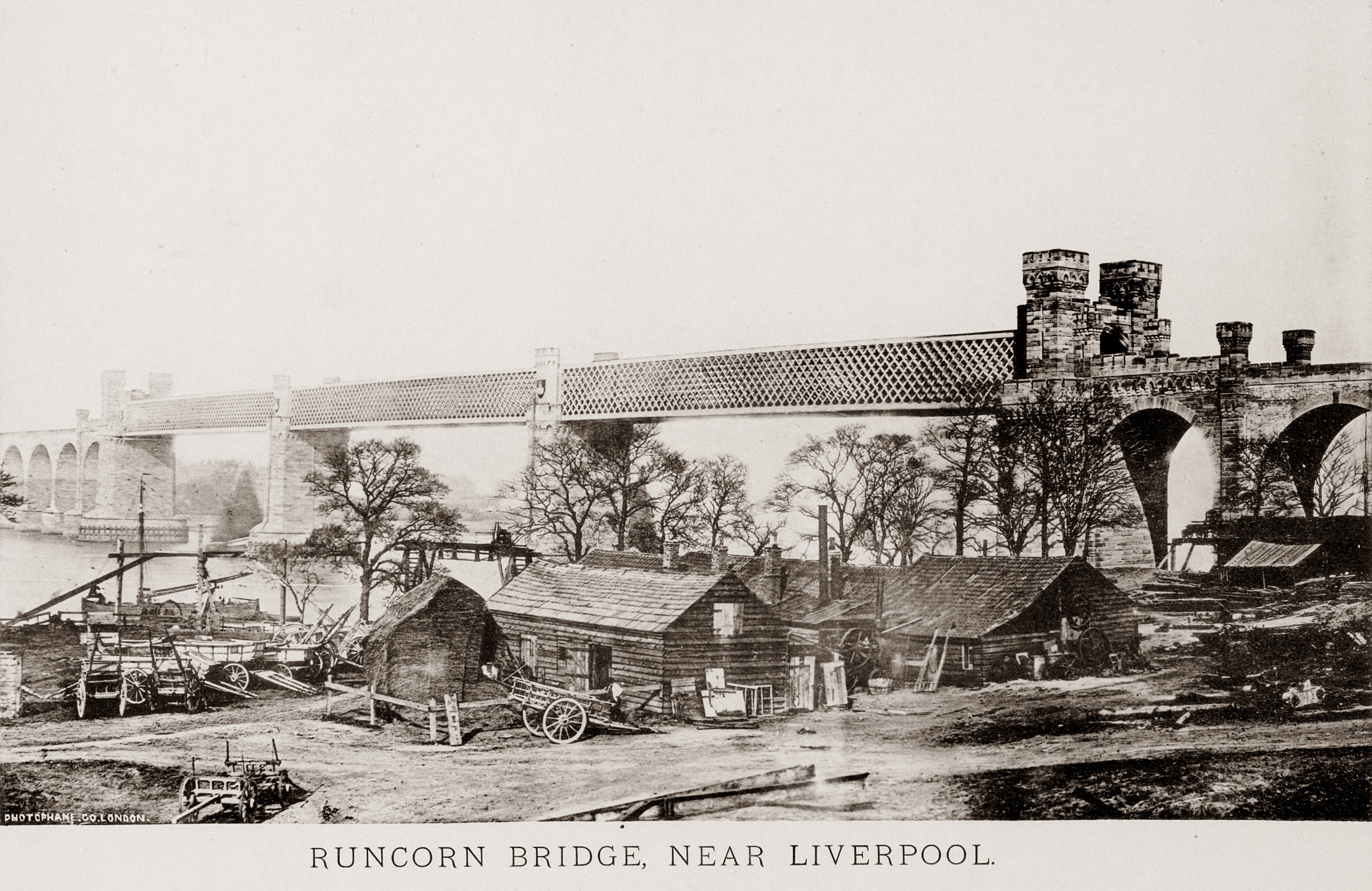
Runcorn Railway Bridge, sometime around 1890

Burns advertised himself as a "champion all round athlete of the world at diving, swimming, walking, running, boxing, pole jumping, horizontal bar, etc". In 1889, he succeeded in a bet that challenged him to dive off Runcorn Railway Bridge, swim to Liverpool, walk from there to London to dive off London Bridge and then walk back to Liverpool to dive off the same bridge in Runcorn, within nine days. On 15 June 1890, a challenge between him and American athlete Carlisle D. Graham required them both to dive off Runcorn Bridge, swim 300 yards (270 m) then run 10 miles (16 km). To evade police, Burns dressed as an old woman and Graham as a labourer. Burns beat Graham on the swim by 10 minutes and despite initially trailing in the 10 mile race, took the lead after the eighth minute and "won easily".

In January 1891, while walking close to his home on Farnworth Street, Burns lost his footing and broke his right leg. He was assessed by two doctors who determined that it would "be many weeks before poor Burns is able to attend to his professional duties", with him having to "indefinitely postpone" a planned 187 feet (57 m) dive off the Forth Bridge and a non-stop 100-mile run. In December 1892, when preparing to dive off the Prince's Dock Pierhead in Liverpool, he was arrested by police on suspicion of being intoxicated with alcohol. Following interview, he was bailed out by friends with a fine of 5 shillings plus costs. On 7 August 1893, while preparing to dive from a 70 feet (21 m) high platform at Sheffield Botanical Gardens in front of several thousand spectators, a piece of timber snapped and he fell to the ground. He was picked up unconscious and taken to hospital, where he recovered well with just concussion. Burns gained much sympathy and in October 1893, a gala concert was held in the Montgomery Hall for his aid, entertaining a large audience. During the interval, Burns himself appeared and "was very cordially greeted", while it was hoped he would be the primary beneficiary from the concert's proceeds.

The many dives undertaken by Burns included jumping off the Clifton Suspension Bridge and reportedly the Forth Bridge. Doubts were cast by railway officials as to whether Burns did actually jump off the Forth Bridge, with witness statements from two duty watchmen declaring that they did not see him, while authorities noted that workmen who had previously fallen from the same position had sustained serious injury. On 2 January 1897, the Edinburgh Evening News reported the names of several individuals who signed to say that they witnessed the dive. On separate occasions, as well as diving he was also known to jump from moving trains, once into Liverpool docks and another time from a train as it crossed the Thames. He used this tactic on some occasions in order to get onto a bridge to undertake a dive. Very few of his jumps had approval from the authorities and he would often be arrested, either before or after his diving attempt. Burns went to great lengths to avoid arrest, at one time dressing himself as a woman when at Trafford Bridge in Manchester.

=== Scotland ===
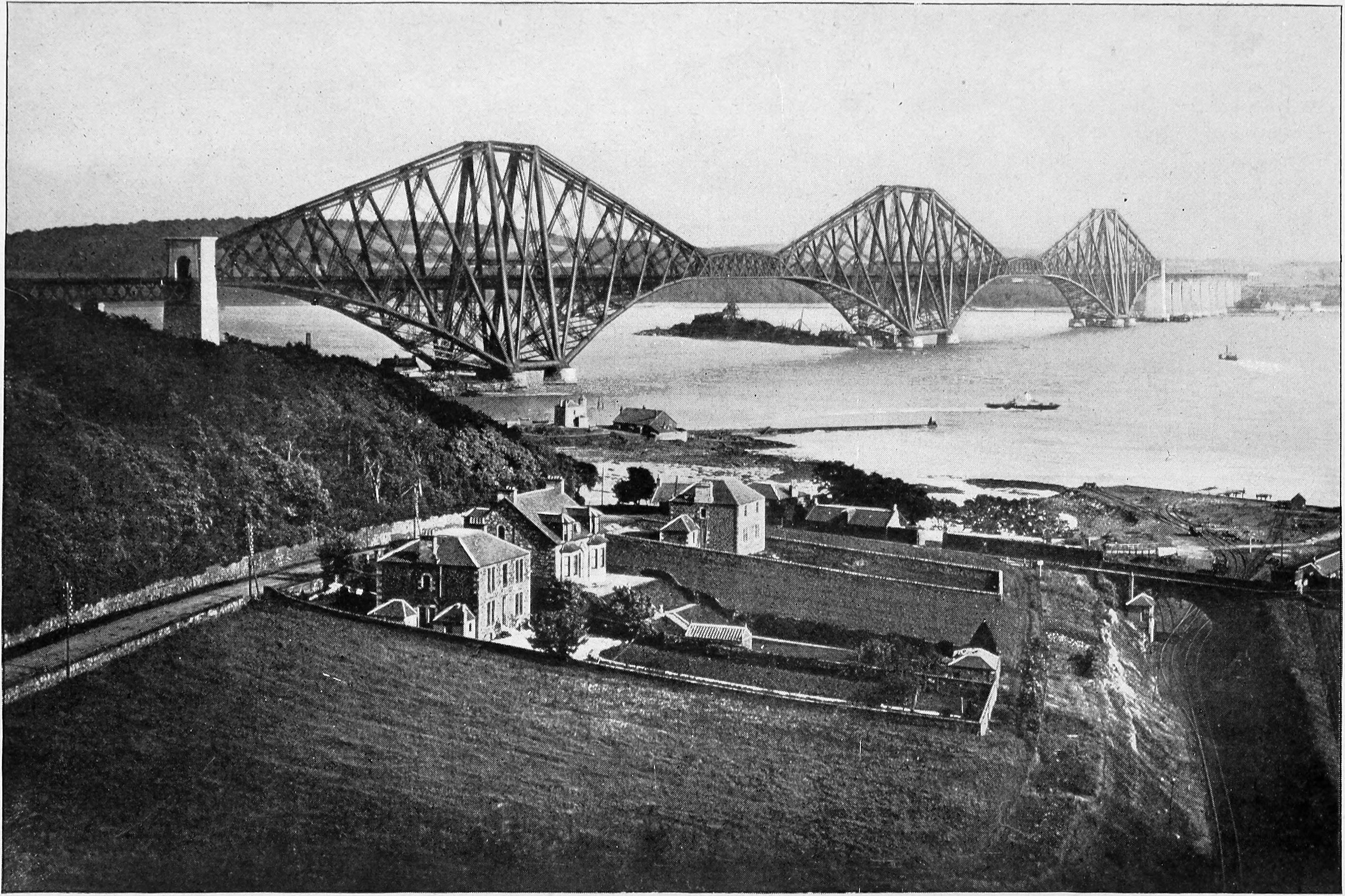
Forth Bridge as it appeared in 1891

In November 1890, he jumped off a bridge in Glasgow in front of a crowd of 22,000. Upon landing, he was chased by police but escaped. Burns would frequently get into altercations with the police and in 1892, was taken into custody after diving off bridges in Ayr, Scotland. He was released after the 10 shilling bail was reported to have been paid by a stranger.

On a visit to Dundee, Scotland in 1895, Burns was appearing at the Grand Carnival in West Craigie Park when he attempted to dive off the Tay Bridge. Despite thinking just a few of his friends were the only ones to know of his intentions, he arrived at the bridge to find it policed with railway officials and ultimately aborted his planned dive, telling a reporter that he would "do it some other day". His second attempt was on 29 January 1897, when on a train with friends from Tay Bridge railway station, dived into the icy waters just as the train was about to begin crossing the bridge. The boat that was meant to collect him was too distant, although several workmen on the bridge threw railway sleepers down for him as a float, until he could be retrieved by a steamboat. Despite being handed over to police, he was released after two hours, while his dive had caused excitement in Dundee, with many having admiration for his diving activities.

=== United States ===
Burns had been due to sail with his backer to New York in September 1893, where on arrival he would post a forfeit with the National Police Gazette and challenged any man in America to a jump or dive from any altitude between 112–135 feet (34–41 m). Burns was not particularly well known in America at this time but was described as being "a wonderful bridge jumper". He was unable to make the journey following an accident the month before.

=== International recognition ===
In August 1893, Burns was recognised in America by the Baltimore Express, which reported on his diving feats into the Royal Aquarium and from various British railway bridges. The paper compared him to American diver Steve Brodie, suggesting that Burns's dives put Brodie's and other bridge jumpers' efforts "in the shade". On 25 June 1895, he was recognised by the Daily Argus as "a noted swimmer and diver", reporting on his 100 feet (30 m) dive from a moving train into the River Mersey. In October 1896, the Kendalleville Standard reported on his dive from London Bridge, in a wager that he was to dive from the bridge then run 128 miles (206 km) to Yarmouth. Despite being arrested after the dive, he won the wager by completing the challenge at a time of 23 hours and 40 minutes. In January 1897, Burns was described by American newspaper the Evening Tribune as being "greater than Steve Brodie of bridge jumping". Having jumped off various railway bridges in England and Scotland, Burns challenged any other bridge jumper in the world to equal his feats, expressing his intention to dive off trains in America if he could not find a suitable challenger in Britain.

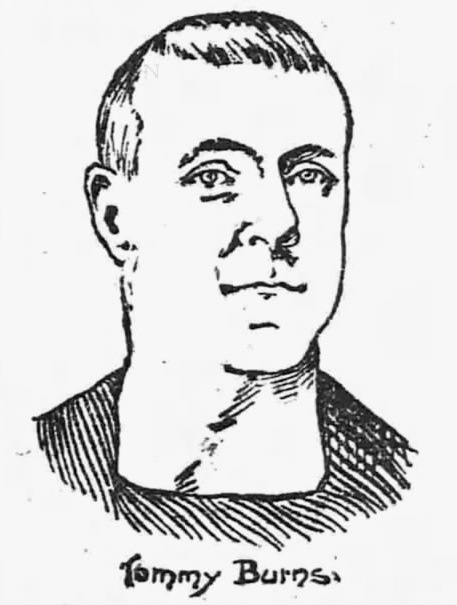
A portrait of Tommy Burns as featured in The Courier and Argus newspaper on 30 January 1897

== Personal life ==
Burns was reported by the Baltimore Express in 1893 to be 5.5 feet (1.7 m) in height and "the very picture of an athlete", with long experience in swimming and water gymnastics and by this time, had already won over 400 prizes. He was married to 24-year-old Marie Burns at the time of his death, who was widowed after nine months of marriage. In May 1893, his weight was reported as being 11 stone 4 pounds (72 kg; 158 lb). His father was Patrick Burns and he had a sister, Elizabeth "Lizzie" Burns.

As well as diving, Burns was also known to be a life saver. In May 1884, he dived to help a ferry passenger who had lost his balance and fell into the river while trying to retrieve his hat. Burns put the man onto his back while keeping himself above water until a yacht rescued them. By 1893, Burns had saved 32 lives and by October 1896, was believed to be responsible for saving the lives of 43 people, including steeplechase jockey Mr W Gale. He held every medal and certificate from the Royal Humane Society for saving lives. In March 1895, he was the only man to dive off the roof of the Royal Aquarium into a tank that was just 6 feet (1.8 m) deep. By the early 1890s, he lived at 113 Farnworth Street, Liverpool.

== Death ==
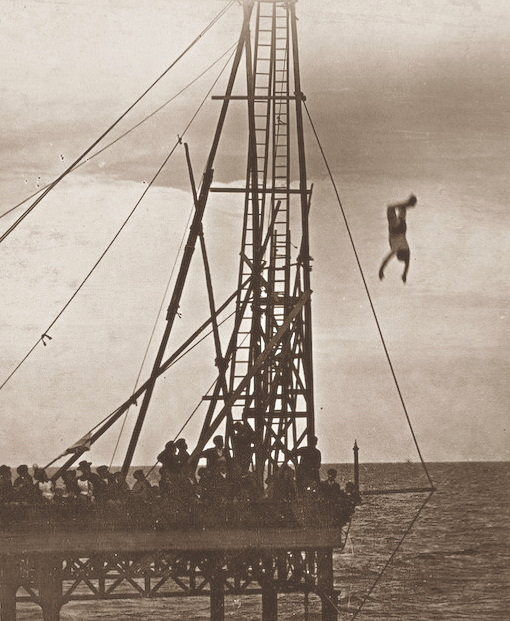
Snapshot of Burns' fatal dive, taken by Robert Morris Evans

In July 1897, Burns dived 100 feet (30 m) into the sea off Rhyl Pier and was observed by around 3,000 spectators. Some of the spectators thought he did not look well enough to be diving, with rumours that he may have been intoxicated with alcohol. Having kept the crowd waiting for around 45 minutes, when he did dive, he twisted awkwardly, landing heavily on his back. He was seen struggling to swim the 800 feet (240 m) back to the shore and when aided by swimmers and brought back onto the pier, was found to be unconscious. Despite trying for 20 minutes to resuscitate him, the coastguard team was unable to save him and he was declared dead. At the time of his death, he was described as "the undefeated champion of high diver of the world".

During the inquest, it was reported that Burns appeared to the piermaster as "in drink, but not drunk", when they met at Rhyl railway station. Other reports suggested he was not quite sober on arrival and advised to rest, which he did for 2 hours before his dive. During his dive, which was hindered by a strong north-west wind, he turned and "fell flat on his back with a thud". Dr W T Girdlestone suggested that in his opinion, Burns may have sustained concussion by the awkward descent and that in a dazed state, had drowned. The coroner, during summing up, expressed that he thought Burns should not have been allowed to dive given his intoxicated state, although did not believe there was any criminal negligence attributable to anyone. Despite his alcohol consumption, it was understood that witnesses did not believe his death was due to his excessive drinking and the jury's verdict was one of accidental drowning. Immediately following the inquest, it was stated publicly that his widow was penniless and unable to remove the body without financial assistance. A subscription list was opened and collected £3 and 18 shillings, which after paying the charge for transporting the corpse to Liverpool, the remainder was handed to his widow. As his body was carried from the pier to the railway station, the only mourners were his widow and a lady friend, although a large number of people were in attendance at the railway station and it was reported that "every mark of respect was shown".

Burns was buried in West Derby Cemetery, Liverpool on 10 July, his body being carried by members of Tom Woods's minstrel troupe from the Pier Head. Rhyl Pier provided the coffin made of oak and brass-mounted, as Burns's wife was penniless. The coffin was made by Mr H. T. Roberts who also took charge of the funeral arrangements. Tommy was buried in the Catholic part of the cemetery and his coffin bore the inscription: "Thomas Burns, died July 6th, aged thirty years, R.I.P." A fund-raiser was held for his widow by another professional diver, Ted Heaton, who dived from the same platform on Rhyl Pier that Burns had used on his last dive and raised £3 and 10 shillings for the Burns family. A verdict of accidental death was reached at the inquest.
