= Arthur Cheetham =

British film director

- Born: 1864; Derby, Derbyshire, England
- Died: 15 January 1937 (aged 72–73); Tring, Hertfordshire, England
- Occupations: Film maker, cinema proprietor
- Years active: 1898–1912

Arthur Cheetham (1864 – 15 January 1937) was an English-born Welsh filmmaker, who became the first of his profession to be based in Wales. His legacy is a collection of eight surviving films, including one of the oldest extant British football 'shorts' from 1898. Cheetham, along with fellow cinematic pioneer, William Haggar, are recognised as the only Welsh-based film makers of importance before the First World War.

== Life history ==
Cheetham was born in Derby in 1864, but moved to Wales in the 1880s, basing himself in Rhyl. He took up several jobs, including printer, film exhibitor, hygienist and phrenologist. He first began showing films in Rhyl in 1897, and the next year he made his debut movie, of children playing on Rhyl sands. Although not the first person to film in Wales, American Birt Acres had filmed in Cardiff in 1896, he was the first person based in Wales to make films in the country.

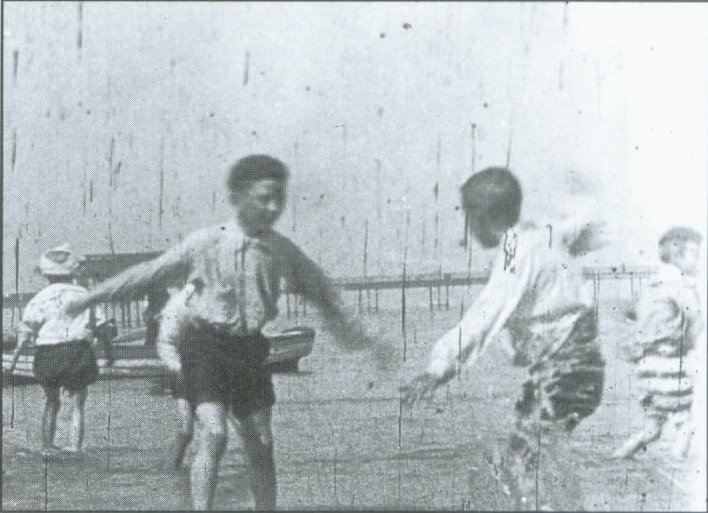
Still from children playing on Rhyl Sands (1898)

Cheetham continued filming until at least 1912, but it was between 1898 and 1899 that he was most active, making over 30 'shorts' which he would then show at local halls he hired for the purpose. Of his films, at least eight survive to this day. The majority of his films were of everyday life, including the self-explanatory Rhyl May Day Procession, Mailboat Munster Arriving at Holyhead, Irish Mail Train going through Rhyl Station and Ladies Boating at Aberystwyth Bay; all of which were shot in 1898. Of his surviving films, those of special note include Blackburn Rovers v West Bromwich Albion (1898), one of the oldest surviving films of an association football match and E.H. Williams and his Merrie Men (1899), an important record of a minstrel show held in Rhyl. Two of his films to include notable people include Royal Visit to Conway which captures the Duke and Duchess of York on 26 April 1899 and a 1903 record of Buffalo Bill Cody during the showman's visit to Rhyl.

Cheetham took his films to the rural communities of the area, bringing to many their first experience of cinema. He opened the first all-year-round cinema in Rhyl in 1906, and in 1908 he followed this by opening the first cinema in Colwyn Bay. By 1920, Cheetham was managing public-hall screenings and running cinemas not only in Wales, but also in the Manchester area. Cheetham inspired his son, G.A. Cheetham to take up film making.

Arthur Cheetham died in Tring, Hertfordshire on 15 January 1937.

== Legacy ==
The National Screen and Sound Archive of Wales have audio interviews with Stanley Cheetham, and hold some work by his son G.A. Cheetham, including his 1923 film Unveiling of Aberystwyth War Memorial.

Cheetham is still acknowledged in Wales and his work has been celebrated in several Welsh film festivals, in the 2007 Welsh Classic Film Festival and again in the 2009 Denbigh Film Festival.
