= List of swimming competitions =

Overview of swimming competitions worldwide

Swimming competitions are organised events in which athletes compete in competitive swimming, including pool swimming, open water swimming, masters swimming, and related aquatic disciplines. Competitions take place at local, national, continental and global levels and are organised by bodies including World Aquatics, the International Olympic Committee, continental aquatic organisations and national swimming federations.

The major international swimming competitions include the Olympic Games, World Aquatics Championships, World Aquatics Swimming Championships (25m), World Aquatics Swimming World Cup, World Aquatics Masters Championships and World Aquatics Junior Swimming Championships. Continental championships, national championships, university competitions, age-group events, para swimming competitions and specialist open water races also form an important part of the competitive swimming calendar.

Swimming competitions are conducted in several formats, including long course metres (50 metre pools), short course metres (25 metre pools), short course yards (25 yard pools), and open water environments such as lakes, rivers and oceans.

== Competition formats ==
=== Pool swimming ===
Pool swimming competitions are normally conducted in either:

- Long course metres (LCM) – conducted in 50 metre pools and used for the Olympic Games and World Aquatics Championships.
- Short course metres (SCM) – conducted in 25 metre pools and used for the World Aquatics Swimming Championships (25 m).
- Short course yards (SCY) – primarily used in the United States collegiate and scholastic swimming systems.

=== Open water swimming ===
Open water swimming competitions are held outside swimming pools, commonly in lakes, rivers, seas and coastal waters. Major international open water events include Olympic marathon swimming, World Aquatics Championships open water events, marathon swimming circuits and international open water races.

=== Other competitive swimming disciplines ===
Swimming is also included within:

- Para swimming
- Masters swimming
- Finswimming
- Lifesaving (sport)
- University and school competitions
- Multi-sport competitions

== Major international swimming competitions ==
Swimming competitions are organised at several levels. The Olympic Games represent the highest-profile global sporting event, while World Aquatics championships and circuits provide the principal international swimming competitions outside the Olympics.

Major international swimming competitions
Level	Competition	Organiser	Frequency	Notes
Global multi-sport	Olympic Games	International Olympic Committee	Every 4 years	The highest-profile international swimming competition; pool swimming has featured since 1896 and open water swimming since 2008
Global	World Aquatics Championships	World Aquatics	Usually biennial	Senior long-course world championships including pool and open water swimming
Global short course	World Aquatics Swimming Championships (25m)	World Aquatics	Biennial	Senior world championship for 25 metre pool swimming
Global circuit	World Aquatics Swimming World Cup	World Aquatics	Annual	International elite swimming circuit
Global masters	World Aquatics Masters Championships	World Aquatics	Usually biennial	World championship event for masters athletes aged 25 and older
Global junior	World Aquatics Junior Swimming Championships	World Aquatics	Biennial	Global championship for junior swimmers
Continental	European Aquatics Championships	European Aquatics	Usually biennial	Major European championship event
Continental masters	European Aquatics Masters Championships	European Aquatics	Usually biennial	Major continental masters championship
Multi-sport continental	Commonwealth Games	Commonwealth Sport	Every 4 years	Major multi-sport event featuring swimming

== World Aquatics competitions ==
World Aquatics, formerly known as FINA until 2022, is the international governing body responsible for aquatic sports including swimming, open water swimming, diving, water polo, artistic swimming and related disciplines.

=== World Aquatics championships ===
- World Aquatics Championships (50 m pool and open water), first held in 1973.
- World Aquatics Swimming Championships (25m), first held in 1993.
- World Aquatics Masters Championships, first held in 1986 and previously known as the FINA World Masters Championships.
- World Aquatics Junior Swimming Championships, first held in 2006.

=== World Aquatics international circuits ===
- World Aquatics Swimming World Cup
- World Aquatics Open Water Swimming World Cup
- World Aquatics Marathon Swim World Series
- World Aquatics Champions Swim Series (2019–2021)

== Continental swimming competitions ==
Continental swimming competitions are organised by regional aquatic governing bodies and form the main championship pathway between national competitions and global championships. These include senior, junior, masters and open water competitions.

== African competitions ==
Swimming competitions in Africa are organised primarily by Confederation of African Aquatics and its member federations.

Competition	Level	Notes
African Aquatics Championships	Continental senior	Main African aquatic championships
African Swimming Championships	Continental senior	Established in 1974
African Junior Swimming Championships	Junior	Established in 1988
African Juniors Aquatics Championships	Junior	Multi-discipline aquatic championships
African Masters Aquatics Championships	Masters	Continental masters championship

== American competitions ==
Swimming competitions in the Americas are organised by continental and regional bodies including Panam Aquatics and national swimming federations.

Competition	Level	Notes
Pan American Games	Multi-sport continental	Pool swimming since 1951 and open water swimming since 2007
Junior Pan American Games	Junior multi-sport	Established in 2021
South American Games	Multi-sport continental	Swimming included since 1978
South American Youth Games	Youth	Established in 2013
South American Aquatics Championships	Continental	
South American Swimming Championships	Continental senior	Established in 1929
South American Masters Aquatics Championships	Masters	
South American Juniors Aquatics Championships	Junior	
South American Beach Games	Open water	Open water swimming included since 2009
Central American and Caribbean Swimming Championships	Regional	Established in 1960
Caribbean Islands Swimming Championships	Regional	Established in 1976
CAMEX	Regional	Established in 1986
CARIFTA Swimming Championships	Junior regional	Established in 1985
Bolivarian Games	Multi-sport regional	Swimming included since 1938
Bolivarian Beach Games	Open water	Established in 2012

== Asian competitions ==
Swimming competitions in Asia are organised by Asia Aquatics and national aquatic federations.

Competition	Level	Notes
Asian Games swimming	Multi-sport continental	Swimming has featured since the first Asian Games
Asian Swimming Championships	Continental senior	Established in 1980
Asian Age Group Swimming Championships	Age-group	
Asian Open Water Swimming Championships	Open water	
South Asian Games	Multi-sport regional	Established in 1984
Southeast Asian Games	Multi-sport regional	Swimming included since 1959
Southeast Asian Swimming Championships	Regional	Established in 1977
West Asian Games	Multi-sport regional	Established in 1997
South Asian Swimming Championships	Regional	
Central Asian Swimming Championships	Regional	
West Asian Swimming Championships	Regional	
Asian Indoor and Martial Arts Games	Short course swimming	Swimming included since 2005

== European competitions ==
European swimming competitions are organised by European Aquatics, formerly known as LEN.

Competition	Level	Notes
European Aquatics Championships	Continental senior	Pool swimming since 1926 and open water swimming since 1995
European Short Course Swimming Championships	Continental short course	25 metre pool championship established in 1996
European Sprint Swimming Championships	Short course	Held from 1991 to 1994 before the European Short Course Championships
European Open Water Swimming Championships	Open water	Held from 1989 to 2016
European Junior Open Water Swimming Championships	Junior open water	
European Junior Swimming Championships	Junior	Established in 1967
European U-23 Swimming Championships	U23	Championship for swimmers aged 19–23
European Aquatics Masters Championships	Masters	Established in 1987
European Youth Aquatics Championships	Youth	Junior development championship
Baltic States Swimming Championships	Regional	
Open de Paris de Natation	Invitational	
Balkan Swimming Championship	Regional	
Central Europe Swimming Cup	Regional	
Mediterranean Swimming Cup	Regional	

== Oceania competitions ==
Swimming competitions in Oceania are organised by Oceania Aquatics and national federations.

Competition	Level	Notes
Pacific Games	Multi-sport regional	Swimming included from 1963
Oceania Swimming Championships	Continental	Established in 1993
Oceania Masters Championships	Masters	

== Commonwealth swimming competitions ==
The Commonwealth Games and related competitions provide a major international pathway for swimmers from Commonwealth nations.

Competition	Level	Notes
Swimming at the Commonwealth Games	Senior multi-sport	Swimming has featured since 1930
Commonwealth Youth Games	Youth multi-sport	Established in 2000
Commonwealth Junior Championships	Junior	Swimming competition for Commonwealth nations

== Masters swimming competitions ==
Masters swimming competitions provide opportunities for swimmers aged 25 and over to compete internationally across different age groups. The highest level of masters swimming is the World Aquatics Masters Championships, organised by World Aquatics, with continental and national masters championships also held regularly.

=== Global masters competitions ===
- World Aquatics Masters Championships, formerly known as the FINA World Masters Championships, first held in 1986.
- World Masters Games swimming competitions.

=== Continental masters competitions ===
- European Aquatics Masters Championships
- European Masters Games
- African Masters Aquatics Championships
- South American Masters Aquatics Championships
- Oceania Masters Championships
- Pan American Masters Championships
- Asian Masters Swimming Championships

=== National masters competitions ===
Many countries conduct national masters championships, including:

- United States Masters Swimming national championships
- British Masters Championships
- Australian Masters Championships
- European national masters championships

== Junior, youth and age-group competitions ==
Junior and youth swimming competitions provide an international pathway for developing swimmers before senior competition.

Competition	Level	Organiser	Notes
World Aquatics Junior Swimming Championships	Global junior	World Aquatics	World championship for junior swimmers
Youth Olympic Games	Youth multi-sport	International Olympic Committee	International youth competition
European Junior Swimming Championships	Continental junior	European Aquatics	Established in 1967
European Youth Summer Olympic Festival	Continental youth	European Aquatics	
Commonwealth Youth Games	Commonwealth youth multi-sport	Commonwealth Sport	Junior competition between Commonwealth nations
Junior Pan Pacific Swimming Championships	Regional junior	Pan Pacific nations	Established in 2005
African Junior Swimming Championships	Continental junior	African Aquatics	
Asian Age Group Swimming Championships	Continental age-group	Asia Aquatics	
CARIFTA Swimming Championships	Regional junior	Caribbean	Established in 1985

== Para swimming competitions ==
Para swimming is the competitive swimming discipline for athletes with physical, visual or intellectual impairments and is governed internationally by World Para Swimming.

Competition	Level	Notes
Paralympic Games	Global multi-sport	Swimming has featured since 1960
World Para Swimming Championships	Global	Formerly IPC Swimming Championships
World Para Swimming European Championships	Continental	
Deaflympics	Global deaf sport	
INAS World Swimming Championships	Intellectual disability swimming	
Special Olympics World Summer Games	Global multi-sport	Swimming is included as a competitive sport for athletes with intellectual disabilities
Commonwealth Games para swimming	Multi-sport	Included as part of the swimming programme

== University and school swimming competitions ==
Swimming competitions are also organised for university and school athletes worldwide.

Competition	Level	Notes
World University Games	Global university	FISU World University Games, formerly the Universiade. Swimming has featured since 1959
World School Swimming Championship	Global school	Established in 1991
Asian Schools Swimming Championships	Regional school	
NCAA Division I men's swimming and diving championships	United States university	Established in 1924
NCAA Division I Women's Swimming and Diving Championships	United States university	Established in 1982
NCAA Men's Division II Swimming and Diving Championships	United States university	Established in 1964
NCAA Women's Division II Swimming and Diving Championships	United States university	Established in 1982
NCAA Men's Division III Swimming and Diving Championships	United States university	Established in 1975
NCAA Women's Division III Swimming and Diving Championships	United States university	Established in 1982
NAIA Men's Swimming and Diving Championships	United States university	Established in 1957
NAIA Women's Swimming and Diving Championships	United States university	Established in 1981
NCAA Swimming Championship (Philippines)	University	Established in 1926

== Military and lifesaving competitions ==
Swimming is included in several military and lifesaving sporting competitions.

== Military and lifesaving competitions ==
Swimming is included in several international military and lifesaving competitions. Military swimming events are organised for armed forces athletes through the International Military Sports Council (CISM), while lifesaving competitions are organised internationally through lifesaving sport organisations.

Competition	Level	Notes
Military World Championships	International military sport	World championship events for military athletes across individual sports, including swimming
Military World Games	International military multi-sport	Established in 1995; includes swimming as part of the sporting programme
World Life Saving Championships	International lifesaving	Established in 1955; includes pool and surf lifesaving competitions

== Special affiliation and community events ==
Some multi-sport competitions include swimming programmes organised around shared cultural, religious, community or social affiliations. These events are distinct from mainstream international swimming championships but provide additional competitive opportunities for swimmers.

Competition	Affiliation	Notes
Islamic Solidarity Games	Religious and cultural	Established in 2005
Maccabiah Games	Jewish sporting movement	Established in 1932
Gay Games	Community multi-sport event	Swimming included within the sporting programme

== Finswimming competitions ==
Finswimming is an aquatic discipline involving swimming with fins and related equipment. International competitions are organised by the Confédération Mondiale des Activités Subaquatiques (CMAS).

Competition	Level	Notes
Finswimming at the World Games	Global multi-sport	Included since 1981
Finswimming World Championships	Global	Established in 1976
Texas Open Finswimming Invitational	Invitational	Established in 1999

== National swimming championships ==
National championships are the primary domestic elite competitions for swimmers and are often used as selection events for international competitions.

=== Australia ===
- (Australia) Australian Swimming Championships
- (Australia) Australian Short Course Swimming Championships

=== Belgium ===
- (Belgium) Belgian Open Swimming Championships

=== Brazil ===
- Brazil Swimming Trophy, formerly the Maria Lenk Trophy
- (Brazil) Brazilian Open Championships

=== China ===
- (China) Chinese National Swimming Championships
- (China) Chinese National Short Course Swimming Championships

=== Finland ===
- (Finland) Finnish championships in aquatics, 1906–1926

=== France ===
- (France) French Elite Open Swimming Championships

=== Hungary ===
- (Hungary) Hungarian National Swimming Championships

=== Ireland ===
- (Republic of Ireland) Irish Open Short Course Swimming Championships

=== Italy ===
- (Italy) Italian National Championships (Spring – Absolute, Summer and Winter), including international participation

=== Japan ===
- Japan National Swimming Championships (Japan Swim)

=== Lithuania ===
- (Lithuania) Lithuanian Swimming Championships

=== Russia ===
- (Russia) Russian National Swimming Championships

=== South Africa ===
- South Africa National Open Water Championships
- (South Africa) Telkom SA National Aquatic Championships

=== Sweden ===
- (Sweden) Swedish Swimming Championships, established in 1899
- (Sweden) Swedish Short Course Swimming Championships, established in 1953

=== Great Britain ===
- (United Kingdom) Aquatics GB Swimming Championships (formerly British Swimming Championships), usually held April
- (United Kingdom) Aquatics GB National Summer Championships, usually held July/August
- (United Kingdom) SE National Summer Championships, usually held July/August
- (United Kingdom) SE National Short Course Championships, usually held December

=== United States ===
- (United States) U.S. Open (swimming), established in 1985
- United States Open Water National Championships
- United States Short Course Swimming Championships
- United States Spring Swimming Championships, established in 1962
- United States Swimming National Championships

== Professional and invitational swimming competitions ==
Professional and invitational competitions provide elite swimmers with opportunities to compete outside major championships.

Competition	Period	Notes
World Aquatics Swimming World Cup	Annual	Global elite swimming circuit
International Swimming League	2019–2021	Team-based professional swimming competition
Duel in the Pool	2003–2022	Team competition originally between the United States and Australia
Mare Nostrum series	Annual	European invitational series
Pan Pacific Swimming Championships	Since 1985	Organised by Pan Pacific nations
Junior Pan Pacific Swimming Championships	Since 2005	Junior competition between Pan Pacific nations
USA Swimming Pro Swim Series	Annual	United States elite swimming series
Open de Paris de Natation	Invitational	
Nico Sapio Trophy	Invitational	
Sette Colli Trophy	Invitational	
South Africa Swimming Grand Prix series	Invitational	
Swedish Swimming Grand Prix series	Invitational	

== Open water and marathon swimming events ==
Open water swimming competitions are held over natural bodies of water including lakes, rivers, channels and oceans. Major events include World Aquatics championships and international marathon swimming races.

Competition	Location/type	Established
World Aquatics Marathon Swim World Series	International circuit	2007
Auckland Harbour Crossing Swim	Harbour crossing	2004
Basel Rhine Swim	River swim	1980
Bosphorus Cross Continental Swim	Channel crossing	1989
Brighton Jetty Classic	Ocean swim	2006
Cadiz Freedom Swim	Open water	
Cole Classic	Ocean swim	1982
Cruce a Nado Internacional	Open water	1980
Lake Zurich Swim	Lake swim	
Lucky's Lake Swim	Lake swim	1989
Meis–Kaş Swim	International channel swim	2005
Midmar Mile	Lake swim	1974
Oceans Seven	Global open water challenge	2008
Pier to Pub	Ocean swim	1981
Race to Prince's Bridge	River swim	1913–1963 and 1987–1991
Rottnest Channel Swim	Channel swim	
Santa Fe-Coronda Marathon	River marathon	1961
Shark Island Swim Challenge	Ocean swim	1987
Vansbrosimningen	Open water	1950

== Other swimming competitions ==
A number of additional swimming competitions are organised internationally, regionally or by specialist organisations.

Competition	Notes
Arab Swimming Championships	Regional championship
Swimming at the Mediterranean Games	Swimming competition within the Mediterranean Games; included since 1951
Mediterranean Beach Games	Includes open water swimming and finswimming
Brazil Swimming Trophy	National/international invitational competition
José Finkel Trophy	Brazilian swimming competition established in 1972
Commonwealth Games	Multi-sport event featuring swimming since 1930

== Historic swimming competitions ==
A number of swimming competitions have been discontinued, replaced or incorporated into newer events.

Competition	Period	Notes
European Sprint Swimming Championships	1991–1994	Replaced by the European Short Course Swimming Championships
FINA Champions Swim Series	2019–2021	World Aquatics elite invitational series
International Swimming League	2019–2021	Professional team-based swimming league
World Open Water Swimming Championships	2000–2010	Former open water world championship event

== See also ==
- Swimming (sport)
- World Aquatics
- World Aquatics Championships
- Swimming at the Summer Olympics
- Swimming at the Summer Paralympics
- Open water swimming
- Masters swimming
- List of Olympic medalists in swimming
- World record progression in swimming
- History of swimming
