= Meisenheimer =

Meisenheimer is a surname. Notable people with the surname include:

- Darrel Meisenheimer (1927–1997), American football player
- Jakob Meisenheimer (1876–1934), German chemist
- Johannes Meisenheimer (1873–1933), German zoologist
- John L. Meisenheimer (born 1933), American chemist
- Lucky Meisenheimer (born 1957), American actor
