= Immune (disambiguation) =

Immune usually refers to biological immunity to harmful organisms.

Immune may also refer to:

- Immune (album), by Soul Embraced, 2003
- "Immune", a song by Godsmack from Godsmack, 1998
- "Immune", a song by Low from Secret Name, 1999
- "Immune", a song by Tinfed from Tried + True, 2000
- "Immune" (Law & Order: UK), a 2011 television episode
- The Immune, a 2011 novel by Lucky Meisenheimer

== See also ==
- Immunity (disambiguation)
