= Erkal =

Erkal is a Turkish surname, and it may refer to:

- Genco Erkal (1938–2024), Turkish drama actor
- İbrahim Erkal (1966–2017), Turkish singer, songwriter, composer and actor
- Nilay Erkal (born 1999), Turkish long-distance swimmer
- Rebii Erkal (1911–1985), Turkish footballer and manager
