= European Aquatics =

European swimming association

- Sport: Aquatic Sports
- Membership: 52 federations
- Founded: 1927; 99 years ago
- Affiliation: World Aquatics
- Headquarters: Nyon
- Location: Switzerland
- President: António José Silva

Official website
- europeanaquatics.org

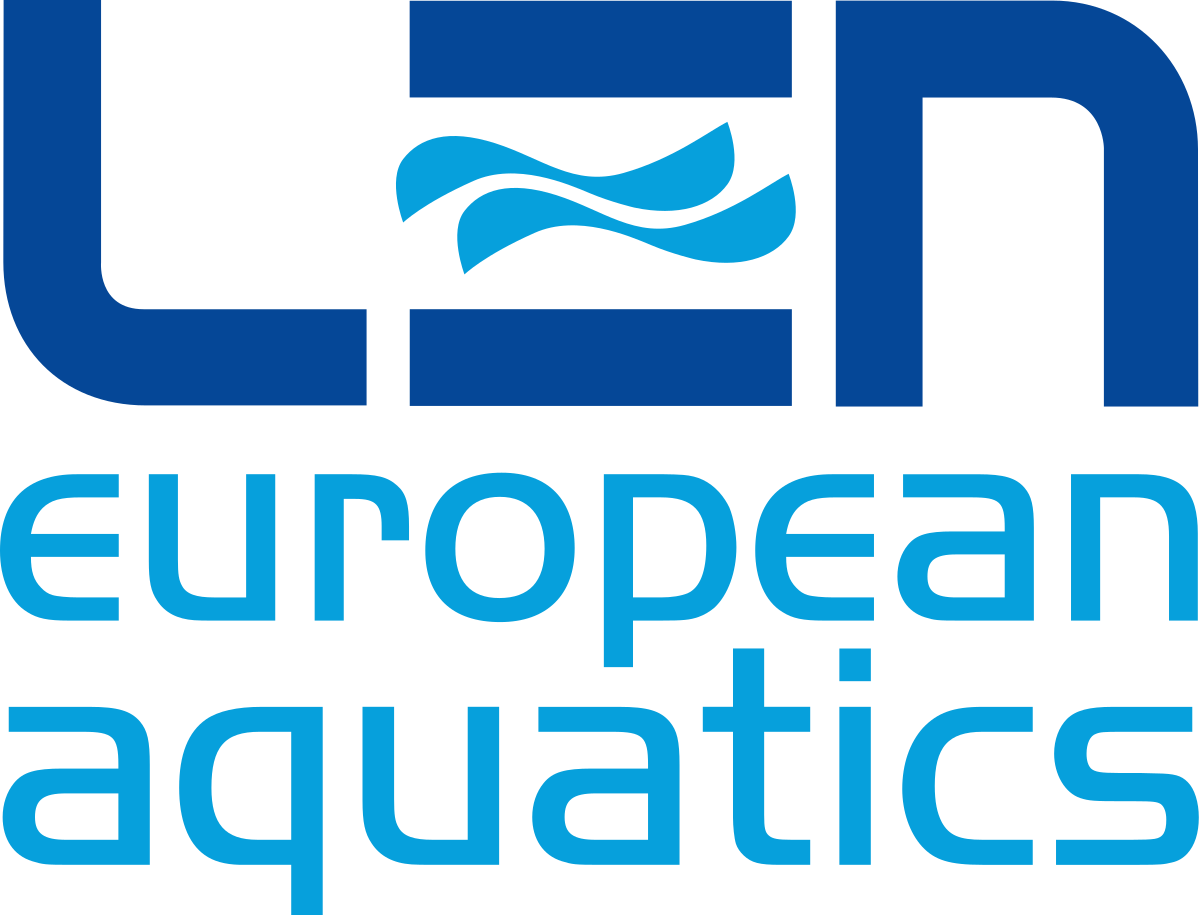
LEN logo before rebranding

European Aquatics (formerly French: Ligue Européenne de Natation, English: European Swimming League, popularly known by its acronym LEN) is the European governing body for aquatic sports affiliated to World Aquatics — it is the Continental Association for Europe. It was formally organized in 1927 in Bologna, and since 2015 is headquartered in Nyon.

European Aquatics comprises 52 national swimming federations in Europe, and includes Israel which for Olympic-sport purposes is grouped with Europe. European Aquatics is overseen by an elected Bureau (board) composed of Members representing 17 different Federations. European Aquatics oversees aquatic sports in Europe: diving, swimming, open water swimming, synchronized swimming and water polo.

== Events ==
=== Championships ===
European Aquatics organizes one championship (European Aquatics Championships), involving four of the five LEN disciplines (swimming, diving artistic swimming, and open water swimming).

- European Aquatics Championships (held in even years; includes swimming, diving, synchronized swimming and Masters)

=== Discipline championships ===
European Aquatics organizes five more discipline championships (swimming (25m), diving, water polo, artistic swimming, and open water).

- Swimming (25m): European Short Course Swimming Championships (run every year, from 2015 run every second year)
- Diving: European Diving Championships (run every second year since 2009)
- Water Polo: European Water Polo Championship (run every second year)
- Artistic Swimming: European Artistic Swimming Championships (2023)
- Open Water: European Open Water Swimming Championships (run every second year since 2016)

=== Junior championships ===
European Aquatics also runs various competitions restricted to a younger age:

- Swimming: European Junior Swimming Championships (run every year); European U-23 Swimming Championships (run every second year)
- Diving: European Junior Diving Championships (run every year)
- Water Polo: U20, U18 and U16 European Water Polo Championship (run every second year)
- Artistic Swimming: European Junior Artistic Swimming Championships (run every year)
- Open Water: European Junior Open Water Championships (run every year)

=== Masters championships ===
- Swimming: European Aquatics Masters Championships (run every second year)

== Member federations ==
The following national federations are part of European Aquatics:

Country	Federation	Founded	Code
Albania	Albanian Swimming Federation (FSHN)	1931	ALB
Andorra	Andorran Swimming Federation (FAN)	1986	AND
Armenia	Armenian Swimming Federation	1993	ARM
Austria	Austrian Swimming Federation (OSV)	1899	AUT
Azerbaijan	Azerbaijan Swimming Federation	1992	AZE
Belarus	Swimming Federation of Belarus (BFP)	1959	BLR
Belgium	Royal Belgian Swimming Federation (KBZB/FRBN)	1902	BEL
Bosnia and Herzegovina	Swimming Association of Bosnia and Herzegovina	1946/1992	BIH
Bulgaria	Bulgarian Swimming Federation (BFPS)	1931	BUL
Croatia	Croatian Swimming Federation (HPS)	1909	CRO
Cyprus	Cyprus Swimming Federation (KOEK)	1972	CYP
Czech Republic	Czech Swimming Federation (ČSPS)	1919/1993	CZE
Denmark	Danish Swimming Union (SVØM)	1907	DEN
Estonia	Estonian Swimming Federation (EUL)	1910	EST
Faroe Islands	Faroe Islands Swimming Association (SSF)	1980	FAR
Finland	Finnish Swimming Federation (SUiL)	1906	FIN
France	French Swimming Federation (FFN)	1920	FRA
Georgia	Georgian Aquatic Sports National Federation	1991	GEO
Germany	German Swimming Federation (DSV)	1886	GER
Gibraltar	Gibraltar Amateur Swimming Association	1946	GIB
Great Britain	Aquatics GB	1869	GBR
Greece	Hellenic Swimming Federation (KOE)	1927	GRE
Hungary	Hungarian Swimming Association (MÚSZ)	1907	HUN
Iceland	Icelandic Swimming Association (SSÍ)	1951	ISL
Ireland	Swim Ireland	1893	IRL
Israel	Israel Swimming Association (ISA)	1951	ISR
Italy	Italian Swimming Federation (FIN)	1899	ITA
Kosovo	Kosovo Swimming Federation (FNK)	1997	KOS
Latvia	Latvian Swimming Federation (LPF)	1905/1988	LAT
Liechtenstein	Liechtenstein Swimming Association (LSchV)	1981	LIE
Lithuania	Lithuanian Swimming Federation (LPF)	1924/1990	LTU
Luxembourg	Luxembourg Swimming and Life-saving Federation (FLNS)	1924	LUX
Malta	Aquatic Sports Association of Malta (ASA)	1925	MLT
Moldova	Water Kind of Sports Federation of the Republic of Moldova (FISN)	1989	MDA
Monaco	Swimming Federation of Monaco (FMN)	1976	MON
Montenegro	Water Polo and Swimming Federation of Montenegro (VPS)	1949/2006	MNE
Netherlands	Royal Dutch Swimming Federation (KNZB)	1888	NED
North Macedonia	Swimming Federation of Macedonia (PFM)	1947	MKD
Norway	Norwegian Swimming Federation (NSF)	1910	NOR
Poland	Polish Swimming Federation (PZP)	1922	POL
Portugal	Portuguese Swimming Federation (FPN)	1930	POR
Romania	Romanian Swimming Federation (FRNPM)	1930	ROU
Russia	Russian Swimming Federation (VFP)	1991	RUS
San Marino	Swimming Federation of San Marino (FSN)	1980	SMR
Serbia	Serbian Swimming Federation (PSS)	1904	SRB
Slovakia	Slovak Swimming Federation (SPF)	1990	SVK
Slovenia	Slovenian Swimming Association (PZS)	1922	SLO
Spain	Royal Spanish Swimming Federation (RFEN)	1920	ESP
Sweden	Swedish Swimming Federation (SSF)	1904	SWE
Switzerland	Swiss Swimming Federation (SSCHV/FSN)	1918	SUI
Turkey	Turkish Swimming Federation (TYF)	1957	TUR
Ukraine	Ukrainian Swimming Federation (USF)	1990	UKR

== European Aquatics Awards winners ==
=== Men's events ===
Year	Winner	Country
Swimming
2008	Alain Bernard	France
2009	Paul Biedermann	Germany
2010	Camille Lacourt	France
2011	Alexander Dale Oen	Norway
2012	Yannick Agnel	France
2013	Yannick Agnel	France
2014	Florent Manaudou	France
2015	Laszlo Cseh	Hungary
2016	Adam Peaty	Great Britain
2017	Adam Peaty	Great Britain
2018	Kliment Kolesnikov	Russia
2019	Adam Peaty	Great Britain
2021	Adam Peaty	Great Britain
2022	David Popovici	Romania
2023	Noè Ponti	Switzerland
2024	Léon Marchand	France
2025	David Popovici	Romania
Diving
2008	Dmitry Sautin	Russia
2009	Tom Daley	Great Britain
2010	Illya Kvasha	Ukraine
2011	Sascha Klein	Germany
2012	Ilya Zakharov	Russia
2013	Patrick Hausding	Germany
2014	Patrick Hausding	Germany
2015	Tom Daley	Great Britain
2016	Jack Laugher	Great Britain
2017	Tom Daley	Great Britain
2018	Jack Laugher	Great Britain
2019	Aleksandr Bondar	Russia
2021	Tom Daley	Great Britain
2022	Jack Laugher	Great Britain
2023	Oleksiy Sereda	Ukraine
2024	Tom Daley	Great Britain
2025	Oleksiy Sereda	Ukraine
Artistic Swimming
2017	Giorgio Minisini	Italy
2018	Giorgio Minisini	Italy
2019	Aleksandr Maltsev	Russia
2021	Aleksandr Maltsev	Russia
2022	Giorgio Minisini	Italy
2023	Dennis Gonzalez Boneu	Spain
2024	Giorgio Minisini	Italy
2025	Dennis González	Spain
Open Water
2008	Maarten van der Weijden	Netherlands
2009	Thomas Lurz	Germany
2010	Valerio Cleri	Italy
2011	Thomas Lurz	Germany
2012	Thomas Lurz	Germany
2013	Thomas Lurz	Germany
2014	Thomas Lurz	Germany
2015	Ferry Weertman	Netherlands
2016	Ferry Weertman	Netherlands
2017	Marc-Antoine Olivier	France
2018	Kristof Rasovszky	Hungary
2019	Kristof Rasovszky	Hungary
2021	Florian Wellbrock	Germany
2022	Gregorio Paltrinieri	Italy
2023	Florian Wellbrock	Germany
2024	Kristof Rasovszky	Hungary
2025	Florian Wellbrock	Germany
Water Polo
2008	Peter Biros	Hungary
2009	Filip Filipovic	Serbia
2010	Vanja Udovicic	Serbia
2011	Stefano Tempesti	Italy
2012	Miho Boskovic	Croatia
2013	Denes Varga	Hungary
2014	Filip Filipovic	Serbia
2015	Dusko Pijetlovic	Serbia
2016	Filip Filipovic	Serbia
2017	Marko Bijac	Croatia
2018	Filip Filipovic	Serbia
2019	Francesco Di Fulvio	Italy
2021	Filip Filipovic	Serbia
2022	Unai Aguirre	Spain
2023	Gergő Zalánki	Hungary
2024	Dušan Mandić	Serbia
2025	Álvaro Granados	Spain
High Diving
2022	Constantin Popovici	Romania
2023	Cătălin Preda	Romania
2024	Aidan Heslop	Great Britain
2025	Constantin Popovici	Romania

=== Women's events ===
Year	Winner	Country
Swimming
2008	Rebecca Adlington	Great Britain
2009	Britta Steffen	Germany
2010	Therese Alshammar	Sweden
2011	Federica Pellegrini	Italy
2012	Ranomi Kromowidjojo	Netherlands
2013	Katinka Hosszu	Hungary
2014	Katinka Hosszu	Hungary
2015	Katinka Hosszu	Hungary
2016	Katinka Hosszu	Hungary
2017	Sarah Sjostrom	Sweden
2018	Sarah Sjostrom	Sweden
2019	Sarah Sjostrom	Sweden
2021	Sarah Sjostrom	Sweden
2022	Rūta Meilutytė	Lithuania
2023	Sarah Sjostrom	Sweden
2024	Sarah Sjostrom	Sweden
2025	Marrit Steenbergen	Netherlands
Diving
2008	Yulia Pakhalina	Russia
2009	Tania Cagnotto	Italy
2010	Christin Steuer	Germany
2011	Tania Cagnotto	Italy
2012	Tania Cagnotto	Italy
2013	Tania Cagnotto	Italy
2014	Tania Cagnotto	Italy
2015	Tania Cagnotto	Italy
2016	Tania Cagnotto	Italy
2017	Nadezhda Bazhina	Russia
2018	Celine van Duijn	Netherlands
2019	Ekaterina Beliaeva	Russia
2021	Tina Punzel	Germany
2022	Chiara Pellacani	Italy
2023	Michelle Heimberg	Switzerland
2024	Andrea Spendolini-Sirieix	Great Britain
2025	Chiara Pellacani	Italy
Artistic Swimming
2008	Anastasia Davydova; Anastasia Ermakova	Russia
2009	Natalia Ishchenko	Russia
2010	Natalia Ishchenko	Russia
2011	Natalia Ishchenko; Svetlana Romashina	Russia
2012	Natalia Ishchenko	Russia
2013	Svetlana Romashina	Russia
2014	Ona Carbonell	Spain
2015	Svetlana Romashina	Russia
2016	Natalia Ishchenko	Russia
2017	Svetlana Kolesnichenko	Russia
2018	Svetlana Kolesnichenko	Russia
2019	Ona Carbonell	Spain
2021	Svetlana Kolesnichenko	Russia
2022	Marta Fiedina	Ukraine
2023	Anna-Maria Alexandri; Eirini-Marina Alexandri	Austria
2024	Vasiliki Alexandri	Austria
2025	Iris Tió	Spain
Open Water
2008	Larisa Ilchenko	Russia
2009	Angela Maurer	Germany
2010	Linsy Heister	Netherlands
2011	Keri-Anne Payne	Great Britain
2012	Eva Risztov	Hungary
2013	Martina Grimaldi	Italy
2014	Sharon van Rouwendaal	Netherlands
2015	Aurelie Muller	France
2016	Sharon van Rouwendaal	Netherlands
2017	Aurelie Muller	France
2018	Sharon van Rouwendaal	Netherlands
2019	Rachele Bruni	Italy
2021	Sharon van Rouwendaal	Netherlands
2022	Sharon van Rouwendaal	Netherlands
2023	Leonie Beck	Germany
2024	Sharon van Rouwendaal	Netherlands
2025	Bettina Fábián	Hungary
Water Polo
2008	Danielle De Bruijn	Netherlands
2009	Iefke van Belkum	Netherlands
2010	Sofia Konukh	Russia
2011	Alexandra Asimaki	Greece
2012	Anni Espar	Spain
2013	Jennifer Pareja	Spain
2014	Maria Garcia	Spain
2015	Roberta Bianconi	Italy
2016	Roberta Bianconi	Italy
2017	Laura Ester	Spain
2018	Sabrina van der Sloot	Netherlands
2019	Laura Ester	Spain
2021	Beatriz Ortiz	Spain
2022	Judith Forca	Spain
2023	Roberta Bianconi	Italy
2024	Beatriz Ortiz	Spain
2025	Nona Pérez	Spain
High Diving
2022	Iris Schmidbauer	Germany
2023	Morgane Herculano	Switzerland
2025	Ginni van Katwijk	Netherlands

== See also ==
- Swimming
- International Swimming Federation – FINA
- List of swimming competitions
