= Lucky's Collectors Guide to 20th Century Yo-Yos =

1999 catalog by Lucky Meisenheimer

- Author: Lucky Meisenheimer
- Cover artist: T. Brown
- Language: English
- Genre: Reference
- Publisher: LJ Swim & Surf
- Publication date: July 1, 1999
- Publication place: United States
- Media type: Print (Paperback)
- Pages: 256 pp (Paperback edition)
- ISBN: 0-9667612-0-0 (Paperback edition)
- OCLC: 42706445
- Dewey Decimal: 688.7/2 21
- LC Class: NK9509.95.Y64 M45 1999

Lucky's Collectors Guide to 20th Century Yo-Yos is a catalog of yo-yos manufactured largely in the United States from the twentieth century. Produced by Lucky Meisenheimer, M.D., the Guinness World Record holder for the largest Yo-yo collection, the book features the history of the yo-yo as well as a price guide. Over one thousand photographs of yo-yos and memorabilia are listed in the book. Collectors frequently use his numbering system to identify particular yo-yos.

A first edition copy of this book is included in the Smithsonian Institution collection donated by Don Duncan Jr.
