= Levent Ateş =

Turkish middle-distance runner

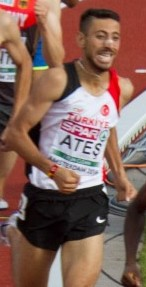
- Levent Ateş in 2016

Personal information
- Nationality: Turkey
- Born: 20 March 1991 (age 35)
- Height: 1.72 m (5 ft 8 in)
- Weight: 64 kg (141 lb)

Sport
- Sport: Running
- Event: 1500 metres
- Club: Galatasaray Athletics

Achievements and titles
- Personal best: 1500 m 3:46.5 (2010)
Medal record
Men's athletics
Representing Turkey
European Team Championships
Silver medal – second place	2017 Lille	1500 m

Levent Ateş (born 20 March 1991) is a Turkish middle-distance runner. He competes for Galatasaray Athletics. Ateş won the silver medal in the 1500m event at the 2017 European Team Championships held in Lille, France.
