= European Aquatics Masters Championships =

Aquatics championship

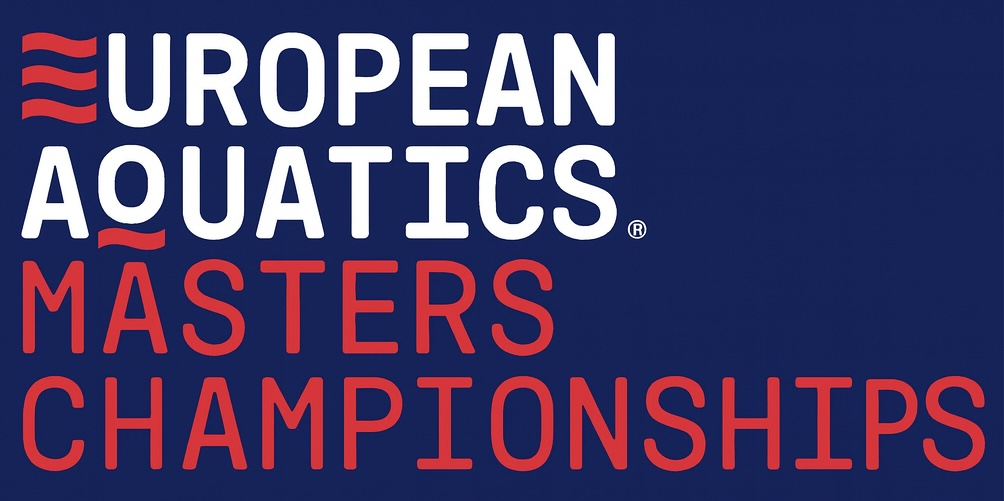
- Status: Active
- Genre: Sporting event
- Date: Mid-year
- Frequency: Biennial
- Country: Varying
- Inaugurated: 1987
- Most recent: Slovakia & Austria 2026
- Previous event: Belgrade 2024
- Next event: 2028
- Participants: 52 Federations
- Organiser: European Aquatics (LEN)
- Website: https://europeanaquatics.org/sports/masters/

The European Aquatics Masters Championships (formerly the LEN Masters Championships and, before 2026, the European Masters Swimming Championships) are the European continental championships for masters athletes in swimming, diving, artistic swimming and open water swimming, with water polo incorporated into the overall championships programme from 2026. The championships are organised by European Aquatics, the governing body for aquatic sports in Europe, and are conducted under World Aquatics Masters rules. Masters competition is generally organised by age groups beginning at 25 years, although age requirements and competition formats vary between disciplines.

First held in Blackpool, Great Britain, in 1987, the championships have developed from a swimming-focused European masters competition into a major multi-discipline event attracting thousands of athletes from across Europe and beyond. The championships were held in odd-numbered years until 2013 and have been held in even-numbered years since 2016. From 2016, they were generally staged in conjunction with the European Aquatics Championships, although the 2018 and 2026 editions were held separately. The scheduled 2020 championships set for Budapest, Hungary, were cancelled as a result of the COVID-19 pandemic.

== History ==
The championships developed during the growth of masters aquatic sport in Europe during the late 20th century. Following the inaugural 1987 championships, the event subsequently moved between European cities biennially, with editions held in Turku, Coventry, Sindelfingen, Riccione, Prague, Innsbruck and other host cities during its early years. The championships were initially organised as a swimming competition, with the programme and structure of European masters competition developing as masters participation expanded across the aquatic sports.

The championships were held biennially in odd-numbered years from 1987 through 2013. The 2013 edition in Eindhoven, Netherlands, marked the end of this initial cycle before the competition moved to even-numbered years. From 2016, the Masters championships were generally held alongside the senior European Aquatics Championships, allowing masters athletes to compete at the same host city and within the wider European Championships programme. The 2016 edition in London was the first Masters championship held under this new arrangement, while the 2018 edition was instead staged separately in Kranj, Slovenia.

The scheduled 2020 championships in Budapest were cancelled because of the COVID-19 pandemic, interrupting the established biennial sequence. The championships returned in Rome in 2022, where more than 5,000 athletes from 38 nations competed across 302 events in five sports. The 2024 edition in Belgrade continued the multi-discipline format, with competitions in swimming, open water swimming, artistic swimming, diving and water polo. By this period, the Masters championships had become one of European Aquatics' largest participation-based continental competitions.

A significant change came in 2026, when the competition was formally presented as the European Aquatics Masters Championships. The 2026 edition was the first to be jointly hosted across two countries, with competitions taking place in Slovakia and Austria. Swimming, open water swimming and water polo were held in Šamorín, artistic swimming in Bratislava, and diving in Graz. European Aquatics also introduced a broader inclusion model for athletes with disabilities, marking a significant expansion of the championships' participation programme.

The 2026 championships also represented a new stage in the development of Masters aquatic sport by bringing water polo into the overall European Aquatics Masters Championships programme. Water polo is regulated separately from the Masters championships in swimming, diving, artistic swimming and open water swimming, but was incorporated into the 2026 multi-discipline event. The inclusion of water polo, together with the participation provisions for athletes with disabilities, broadened the championships beyond their historical identity as primarily a masters swimming competition.

== Editions ==
=== Long course ===
Results:

Year	No.	Host	Dates	Notes
European Masters Swimming Championships
1987	1	Blackpool, United Kingdom	16–20 September	
1989	2	Turku, Finland	30 August–3 September	
1991	3	Coventry, United Kingdom	4–8 September	
1993	4	Sindelfingen, Germany	9–12 September	
1995	5	Riccione, Italy	6–10 September	
1997	6	Prague, Czech Republic	3–7 September	
1999	7	Innsbruck, Austria	25–29 August	
2001	8	Palma de Mallorca, Spain	3–7 July	
2003	9	Millau, France	26–31 August	
2005	10	Stockholm, Sweden	16–21 August	
2007	11	Kranj, Slovenia	28 August–2 September	
2009	12	Cádiz, Spain	15–20 September	
2011	13	Yalta, Ukraine	5–10 September	
2013	14	Eindhoven, Netherlands	31 August–7 September	Results
Held alongside the European Aquatics Championships
2016	15	London, United Kingdom	25–29 May	
2018	16	Kranj, Slovenia	26 August–9 September	Not held jointly with European Aquatics Championships
2020	17	Budapest, Hungary	N/A	Cancelled due to the Covid-19 pandemic
2022	18	Rome, Italy	29 August–4 September	Rome 2022
2024	19	Belgrade, Serbia	26 June–6 July	Belgrade 2024
European Aquatics Masters Championships
2026	20	Šamorín and Bratislava, Slovakia; Graz, Austria	18–30 August	European Aquatics Masters Championships 2026

=== Short course ===
Year	No.	Host	Dates	Notes
European Masters Short Course Swimming Championships
2023	1	Funchal, Portugal	19–25 November	European Aquatics
2025	2	Lublin, Poland	10–14 December	European Aquatics

==== Notes ====
- The championships were originally known as the European Masters Swimming Championships. From 2026, the event was organised as the European Aquatics Masters Championships.
- The championships have featured competition in swimming, diving, artistic swimming, open water swimming and water polo.
- The championships were held in odd-numbered years through 2013. From 2016 onwards, they have been scheduled in even-numbered years, generally in conjunction with the European Aquatics Championships.
- The scheduled 2020 European Masters Swimming Championships in Budapest were cancelled because of the COVID-19 pandemic.
- The 2013 championships included a separate water polo competition in Hungary.
- The 2016 championships were held in conjunction with the 2016 European Aquatics Championships in London, while the 2018 championships were held separately in Kranj, Slovenia.
- The 2022 and 2024 championships were held in conjunction with the 2022 European Aquatics Championships in Rome and the 2024 European Aquatics Championships in Belgrade, respectively.
- In 2023, European Aquatuics first ran a short course championships in Madeira.
- The 2026 championships were the first standalone European Aquatics Masters Championships and the first edition to be jointly hosted across two countries. Competitions were held in Šamorín and Bratislava in Slovakia and Graz in Austria.
- In 2026, swimming, open water swimming and water polo were held in Šamorín, artistic swimming was held in Bratislava, and diving was held in Graz.
- The 2026 championships were the first European Aquatics Masters Championships to include an integrated programme for athletes with disabilities.
- The term artistic swimming is used in accordance with current European Aquatics terminology; the discipline was formerly known as synchronised swimming.

== Host cities ==
Host cities of the European Aquatics Masters Championships

== See also ==
- Masters Swimming
- European Aquatics Championships
- World Aquatics Masters Championships
- World Masters Games
- European Masters Games

== Results ==
- Results
- LEN European Masters Championships 2016
- Past Results
- LEN competitions since 2000
- 2016 report
- 2018 medal table
- XIII European Masters Championships 2011
- European Masters
