= Rauf Hasağası =

Turkish sprinter (1900–1992)

Personal information
- Nationality: Turkish
- Born: 6 August 1900
- Died: 21 July 1992 (aged 91)

Sport
- Sport: Track and field
- Event: 100m

Rauf Hasağası (6 August 1900 – 21 July 1992) was a Turkish sprinter. He competed in the men's 100 metres event at the 1924 Summer Olympics.

Hasağası set several Turkish national records during his career, including over the 100 metres and 200 metres that survived throughout the 1920s.

Hasağası competed for Galatasaray Athletics, and he was one of their "most important" athletes. In 1924, Hasağası won the inaugural Turkish Athletics Championships.

In addition to being an athlete, Hasağası was also a referee.
