= Kuruçeşme =

- Neighbourhood
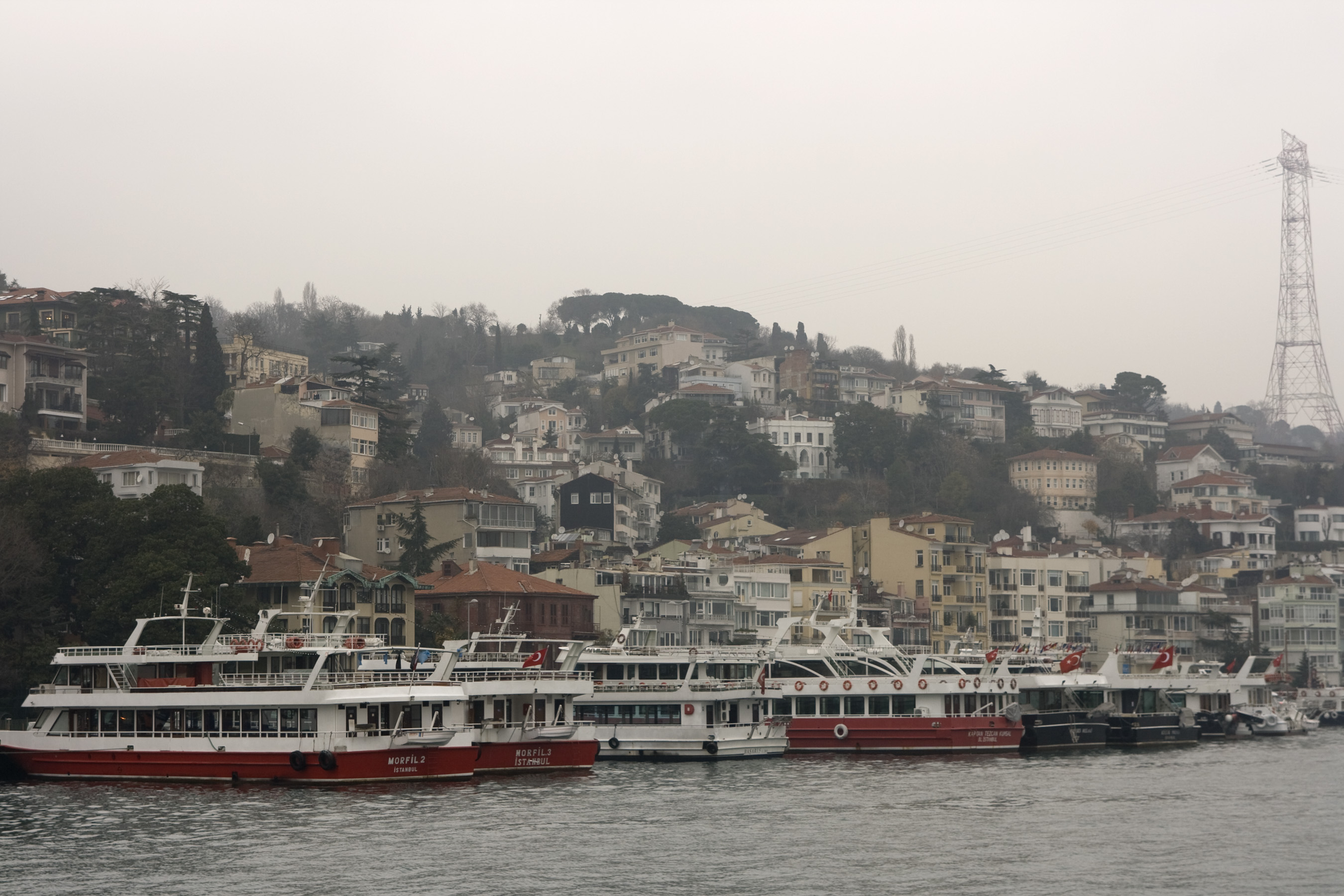
- A view of the Kuruçeşme skyline from the Bosphorus

- Location within Turkey Location within Istanbul
- Coordinates: 41°03′N 29°02′E
- Country: Turkey
- Province: Istanbul
- District: Beşiktaş
- Population (2022): 2,846
- Time zone: UTC+3 (TRT)
- Postal code: 34345
- Area code: 0212

Kuruçeşme is a neighbourhood in the municipality and district of Beşiktaş, Istanbul Province, Turkey. Its population is 2,846 (2022). It is on the European side of the Bosphorus between the neighbourhoods of Ortaköy and Arnavutköy.

Historically, the neighbourhood was called by various names such as Bithias or Bythias, Kalamos, Amopolos, Bytharia. It was located in ancient Thrace and inhabited through Roman times. The present name refers to a historical fountain from the 15th century mosque built by Osman Efendi, the chief tezkire poet of Ottoman sultan Mehmed II (reigned 1444–1446, 1451–1481), and means literally the "Dried fountain".

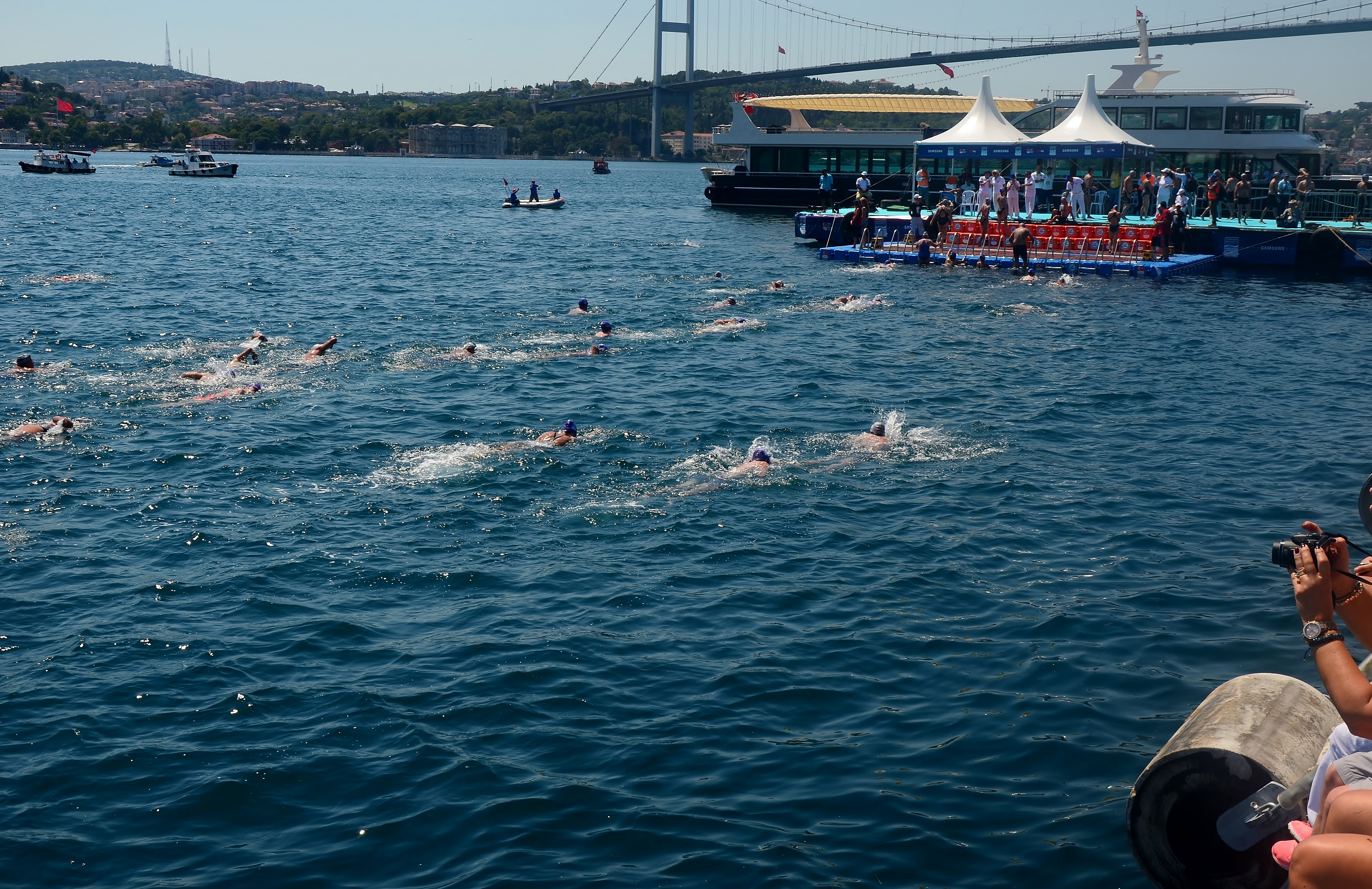
Finish point of the Bosphorus Cross Continental Swim at Cemil Topuzlu Park in Kuruçeşme.

The popular concert venue Paraf Kuruçeşme Arena is situated in Kuruçeşme and the Cemil Topuzlu Park in Kuruçeşme is the finish point of the annual Bosphorus Cross Continental Swim.
