= Nilay Erkal =

Turkish swimmer (born 1999)

Personal information
- National team: Turkey
- Born: 1 February 1999 (age 27) Denizli, Turkey
- Education: Dalhousie University

Sport
- Sport: Swimming
- Strokes: Freestyle
- Club: Galatasaray Sports Club
- College team: Dalhousie University Varsity Women's Swimming
- Coach: Lance Cansdale

Nilay Erkal (born 1 February 1999) is a Turkish long-distance swimmer. She is a member of Galatasaray Athletics. She is also studying in Pharmacy School at Yeditepe University.

Nilay Erkal was born in Denizli, Turkey in 1999. She started swimming at age 8 in Marmaris, Muğla. In 2011, she became Turkish champion in the 200 m butterfly event of 12-year age category.

She won the 2015 Bosphorus Cross Continental Swim in the women's category, and became the first again in 2016 with a time of 0:52:38. She finished the same event in 2017 with a time of 0:55:01 as runner-up in the women's category, and first in the 14–18 years-age category.

In July 2016, she finished 7500m in 9th place in the FINA World Junior Open Water Swimming Championships Hoorn/Netherlands

In 2016 Marathon Swimming Qualification Tournament, she finished 10 km with the time of 2:02:26.8.

In December 2017, she won the bronze medal in 800 m freestyle event of the Vancouver Pacific Swim competition in Canada.

She is the three-time winner of the Meis–Kaş Swim. In 2019, she improved her own course record by five minutes to 1:32.
