= Kastellorizo-Kaş swim =

Annual open water swimming competition

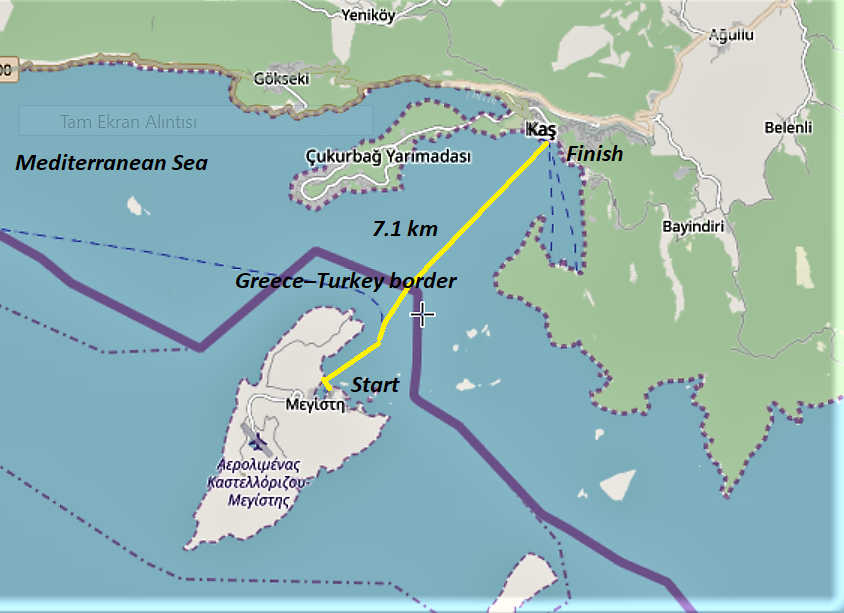
Route of the Kastellorizo-Kaş swim (yellow line).

The Kastellorizo-Kaş swim (Greek: Αγώνας κολύμβησης Καστελλορίζου-Αντιφέλλου,Turkish: Uluslararası Meis Kaş Yüzme Yarışması) is an international cross-border open water swimming competition between the Greek island of Kastellorizo or Megisti (Greek: Μεγίστη) and the village of Kaş (Greek: Αντίφελλος) in the county of Antalya (Greek: Επαρχία Ατταλείας). It has been held since 2005 annually in June to promote the friendship between the two neighboring countries.

The swimming competition is part of the International Lycia-Kaş Culture and Art Festival, which ls being held since late 1990s. The distance of the course in the Mediterranean Sea is 7.1 km (4.4 mi). The race begins at the Kastellorizo harbour and ends in the harbour of Antifellos. Participants must be at least 18 years of age, and must be able to swim 1,500 m in less than 30 minutes. The competitors undergo a health examination administered by a physician before the event.

In 2019, 180 swimmers from 12 nations, including 33 women, took part in the competition. The course record was set in 2019 by the Turkish 20-year-old woman Nilay Erkal with a time of 1 hour and 32 minutes, who improved her own record by five minutes, and was the winner of the competition in the last three years.
