= Galatasaray Athletics =

Galatasaray
- League: Turkey Athletics
- Based in: İstanbul, Turkey
- Arena: Burhan Felek Sports Complex
- Colors: Yellow & Red
- President: Dursun Özbek
- Head coach: Temel Erbek
- Championships: 27 (Turkish League)
- Mascot: Lion
- Website: http://www.galatasaray.org/amator/atletizm/

Galatasaray Athletics Team is the men's and women's athletics section of Galatasaray S.K., a major sports club in Istanbul, Turkey.

== Some notable athletes ==
- Şehit Celal (First Turkish Athlete)
- Silifkeli Şükrü Halil Dölek
- Fuat Salih
- Rıza Salih
- Vildan Aşil Savaşır
- Ömer Besim Koşalay
- Semih Türkdoğan
- Mehmet Ali Aybar
- Naili Moran
- Cezmi Or
- Eşref Aydın
- Jerfi Fıratlı
- Sıla Koloğlu (born 2004), sprinter
- Simay Özçiftçi (born 2003), sprinter
- Cahit Öner
- Şükrü Çaprazlı
- Suat Hayri Ürgüplü
- Turhan Kahraman
- Temel Erbek
- Murat Akman
- Teoman Smith
- Ahmet Karadag
- Ahmet Melek
- Murat Ayaydin
- Rauf Hasağası
- İsmail Nezir

=== Technical staff ===
| Name | Nat. | Job |
|---|---|---|
| Temel Erbek | (Turkey) | Captain general |
| Hasan Özbakır | (Turkey) | A team Coach and Youth Team Manager |
| Uğur Özdemir | (Turkey) | Trainer |

=== Current squad ===
==== Men's squad ====
Turkey

- A-Team
- Kamil Ulaş Öğünç
- Erdem Güler
- Batuhan Eruygun
- Furkan Hasan Can (Captain)
- Mikail Yalçın
- Samet Özdemir
- Mustafa Alpçin
- Aykut Tanrıverdi
- Kutay Kırmızı
- Ali Dereli
- Ahmet Bektaş
- İbrahim Dereli
- Hasan Güler
- Gökhan Arslan
- Koray İmrak
- Fatih Çakmak
- Hakan Karakuş
- Turgay Çabukel
- Mustafa Kıvanç

- Youth Team
- Tugay Levent (Captain)
- Hazar Ilgaz
- Hasan Emir Kırmızı
- Yıldırım Alkan
- İmran Atmaca
- Murat Gültekin
- Okan Bağcı
- Hüseyin Oruçsuz
- Sami Tolga Korkmaz
- Şener Sağlam
- Feyyaz Akça
- Muhammet Maviş
- Artam Diren

- Team Starlets and Under 16 Team
- İbrahim Şan (Starlets Team Captain)
- Mustafa Yavuz (Under 16 Team Captain)
- Samet Barış Avcu
- Mehmet Baykent
- Met Baş
- Yahya Tedbirli
- Ömer Özmen
- İlyas Saban
- Ali Özgür Çakmak
- Erhan Çetin
- Emrah Akbacak
- Yağız Temur
- Melik Çamur
- Muhammet Tok
- Mustafa İnan
- Batuhan
- Erdi Can Kıvılcım
- Bayram Yiğit
- Mert Uğur Savaş
- Umut Uçar
- Mehmet Buğra Gündoğmuş

==== Women's squad ====
Turkey

- Merve Aydın (born 1990), middle-distance
- Nilay Erkal (born 1999), long-distance
- Mohadese Moradi (born 2004), long-distance

== Honors ==
- Turkish Athletics Championship: Winners (27) (Record)
  - 1924, 1927, 1932, 1933, 1951, 1966, 1967, 1968, 1969, 1970, 1971, 1972, 1973, 1974, 1975, 1976, 1977, 1978, 1979, 1980, 1981, 1982, 1983, 1986, 1987, 1988, 1989
- Istanbul Championship: Winners (31) (Record)
  - 1924, 1925, 1926, 1927, 1931, 1933, 1941, 1942, 1945, 1951, 1963, 1965, 1966, 1967, 1968, 1969, 1970, 1971, 1972, 1973, 1974, 1975, 1976, 1977, 1978, 1979, 1980, 1981, 1982, 1983, 1986
- Turkish Athletics League: Winners (1)
  - 1988
- European Youth Athletics Championship:
  - 1995 Belgium: (4.)
  - 1996 Turkey:(2.)
  - 1997 Croatia:(4.)
