= Basel Rhine Swim =

Public sporting event in Switzerland

The Basel Rhine Swim is a public sporting event in the city of Basel in Switzerland. The participants swim in or float on the Rhine river from the banks at the Minster down to the lower Rhine banks for up to fifteen minutes.

During their swim they are escorted and watched by watercraft and lifeguards. The whole distance is about 1.8 kilometers long.

Rhine swimming in Basel is an annual event since 1980 and it always takes place on the first Tuesday after the school holidays in summer. (The alternative date is one week afterwards). It is organized by the city's department of the Swiss Lifesaving Association (SLRG). It starts at 6 p.m. at the Minster ferry on the river strands. For this special event the shipping traffic is usually stopped. The number of participants reaches from a few hundreds to several thousands of swimmer.

In the summer of 2003, roughly 5000 people took part. In 2007, however, the event was cancelled because of extreme flooding.
