= Lucky Meisenheimer =

American actor

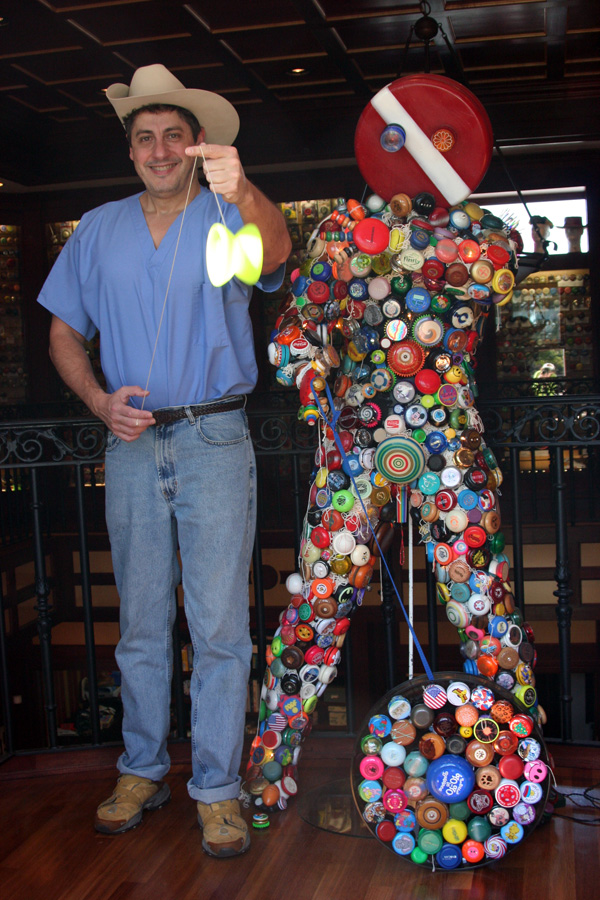
Lucky Meisenheimer with Mr. Bandalore

Lucky Meisenheimer (born 1957) is an American physician, athlete, author, and actor. He is best known for hosting Lucky's Lake Swim, his award winning novel, The Immune, his Guinness world record collection of yo-yos, and his guides, Lucky's Collectors Guide to 20th Century Yo-Yos and Doc Lucky's Bandalorist Guide to Collecting Yo-Yo String Packs and Patches.

== Biography ==
Born John L. Meisenheimer, Jr at Patrick Air Force Base, Florida, the son of John Meisenheimer Sr. and Alice Meisenheimer. He grew up in Richmond, Kentucky, where he attended Model Laboratory School and Eastern Kentucky University. At age 12 he was the southeastern junior muzzleloader rifle champion and record holder. He presented his first scientific paper at the Kentucky Academy of Science “Temperature Dependent Learning in Rana catesbeiana larvae" at age 16. At Eastern Kentucky he was Phi Kappa Phi, Mortar Board, Phi Sigma, and the school record holder in swimming and a Kentucky Intercollegiate swimming champion. He also received national publicity and was listed in Ripley's Believe It or Not! for a swimming stunt, in which he swam a half-mile with his foot in his mouth.

Meisenheimer completed his medical internship at Tucson Medical Center and residency training in dermatology at the Medical University of South Carolina. He has been in a private dermatology and Mohs surgery practice in Orlando Florida since 1987. He has served as the Chief of the Dermatology Division at Orlando Regional Medical Center since 2003 where he has been an assistant clinical professor since 1988.

== Yo-yos ==
A founding board member of the American Yo-Yo Association, he continues to serve as chairman of the world records committee. Meisenheimer is best known for his book Lucky's Collectors Guide to 20th Century Yo-Yos and his Guinness World Record for the largest yo-yo collection. A copy of Lucky's Collectors Guide to 20th Century Yo-Yos is part of the Smithsonian Institution collection. He also created the parody poster "Lucky's Periodic Table of Yo-Yos" and Mr. Bandalore, a statue made of 603 different yo-yos. His yo-yo collection also features the world's largest wooden yo-yo, the Shakamak Yo-Yo, which is 6 feet tall and weighs 820 pounds.

== Swimming ==
An avid open water swimmer and an All-American and world record holder in masters swimming, he has won several open water competitions over the years including the Swimming Hall of Fame Gault Ocean Mile swim, the 12.5-mile Around Key West Swim where he held the fin swimming record, and multiple Triathlon Relay National Championships. He is best known for hosting a daily 1 kilometer open water swim at his home (named Aquatica) since 1989. Dubbed Lucky's Lake Swim, swimmers receive a patch and sign the back wall of his home on completion of the swim.

== Coaching ==
A life member of the American Swimming Coaches Association (ASCA), he is a certified level 5 masters coach and was the head coach of Team Orlando Masters at the YMCA Aquatic Center from 1989 until 2000. He was the president of the Masters Aquatics Coaches Association from 1994–95 and served on the ASCA Certification committee. He is the co-author of "The Masters School" with Judy Bonning and Micheal Collins. In 1994, he started and continues to coach the Special Olympics swimming program (The Man O' War Swim Team) at the YMCA Aquatic Center.

== Film production ==
A member of the Screen Actors Guild, he has appeared in movies and on television. He made his directorial debut and also wrote the featurette film National Lampoon presents "RoboDoc Dissected the Making of the Movie RoboDoc," a parody of behind the scenes making of movie films.

== Film and television appearances ==
- Collector's Call - Yo Yo's (2025)
- World on a String (2012)
- Heritage "The Duncan Yo-Yo Story" (2012)
- National Lampoon Presents RoboDoc (2008)
- RoboDoc Dissected the making of the Movie RoboDoc (2008)
- The Martha Stewart Show (2007)
- Yo-Yo Kings "DVD" (2007)
- The Finger "Film Short" (2006)
- National Lampoon's Comedy Night School (2005, 2006)
- 2003 World Yo-Yo Championships "Documentary" (2003)
- Ultimate Collectors
- Nickelodeon GAS (2000)
- Treasures in Your Home (1999)
- Weird Homes (1998)
- What Would You Do? (1992)
- PM Magazine (1982)
- Real People (1982, 1983)
