= Cole Classic =

Open-water swimming event in Sydney, Australia

The Cole Classic is an open-water swimming event, held annually at Manly in Sydney, Australia. Organisers publicise it as one of Australia's longest running ocean swims. It is organised by Fairfax Events (who also organise City2surf) for The Sydney Morning Herald, with the Manly Life Saving Club.

The race takes place on the first Sunday in February. Both the 1 km and 2 km events start from Shelly Beach and finish at Manly's Steyne Beach.

== History ==
The Cole Classic was started by the Cole family in 1982. The 2 km swim was originally staged at Bondi Beach. In 2007, it was relocated to Manly, on the northern side of Sydney Harbour. Coinciding with the move, a 1 km swim was added to encourage participation of novice swimmers.

In 2009, the swim expected 4,000 combined participants in the two race categories.

In 2010, Luane Rowe, 20, claimed the women's title in the 2 km event (26min) and came third overall. Luane also came second in the 1 km race. Josh Beard, who was the second fastest male in 2010, claimed the 2010 Cole Classic men's trophy in a time of 24min. The oldest swimmer in the field in 2010 was 80-year-old John Kelso from Balgowlah who won the 75-plus category.
