= Lucky's Lake Swim =

Open water swim in Orlando, Florida

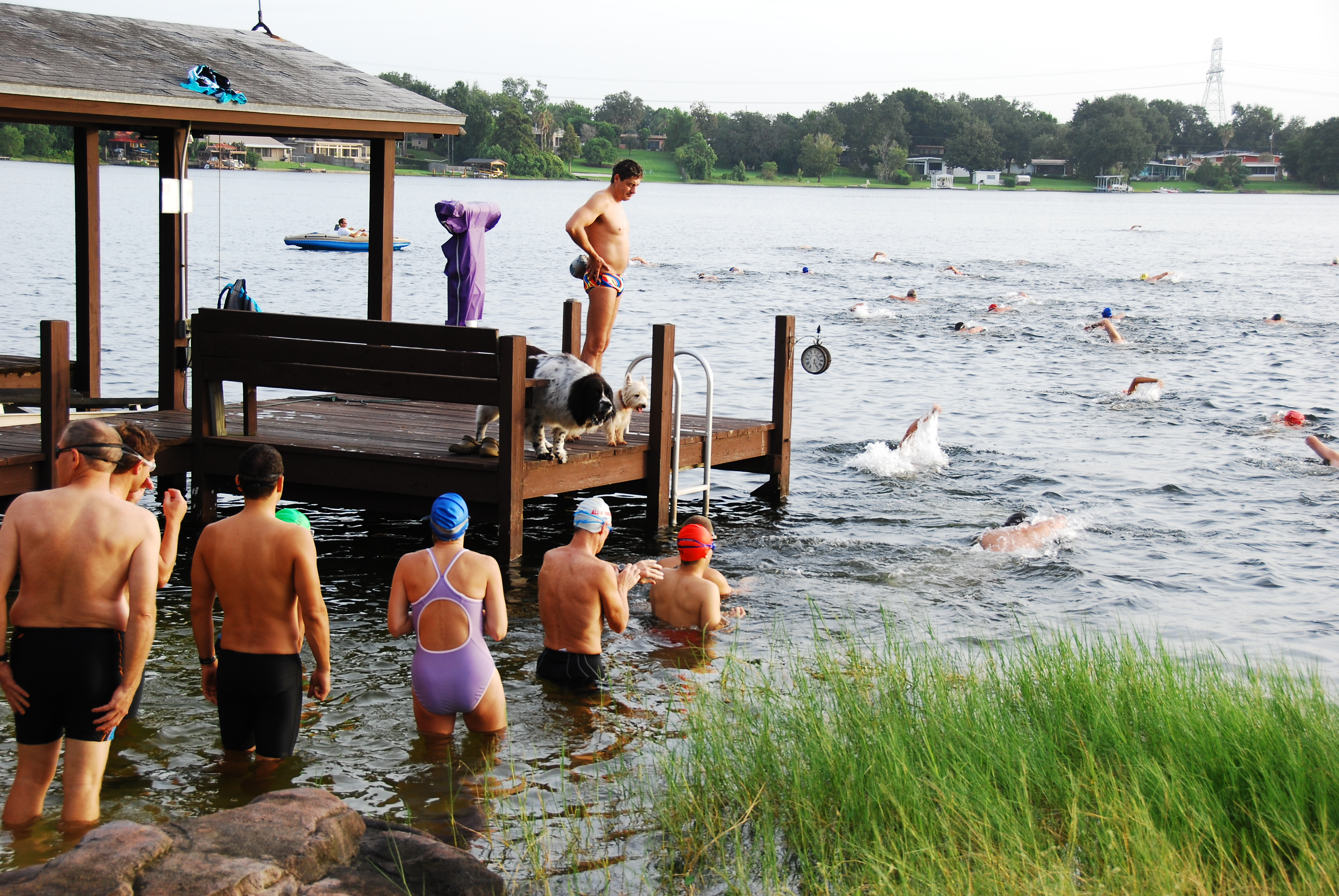
Freeswimmers at Lucky's Lake Swim

Founded in 1989, Lucky's Lake Swim is a daily 1 kilometer open water swim hosted started by Lucky Meisenheimer at his home in Orlando, Florida. The no charge swim has achieved a cult status amongst open water swimmers and triathletes. Thousands have completed the swim. It is originally known as the Aquatica (unrelated to the Orlando water park) 1K enter the food chain swim. The swim is listed by the World Open Water Swimming Association as one of the top 100 open water swims in America.

== History ==
The swim began in 1989 when Lucky Meisenheimer invited friends and masters swimmers he coached at the YMCA Aquatic Center to join him on his morning lake swim. Initially the swim was held on Saturdays but after the first year went to 4 days a week. In 1995, it became a daily swim except for Sundays. Originally, the swim went from April through October, in 2005 the swim went year round. The weekday swims, which are always at 6:30 AM, are started in the dark much of the year. On Saturdays and holidays the swims are at 7:45 AM. The starts are a mass start and no other start times are available. In 2013 timed records began to be recorded for all age groups. The current fastest crossing is 12 mins 58 secs by John Meisenheimer, VII. 9

== The Wall of Fame ==
In 1999, swimmers began signing their names to a wall on the back of the Meisenhiemer's house on the first completion of the 1-kilometer course. Lucky would write one item of sporting accomplishment under the name if one existed. There is now an eclectic mix of accomplishments listed on the wall some that include; Olympic Swimmers, Olympic Water Polo, National Swimming Champions from multiple countries, World Record holders, National Parachuting Champion, Hang Gliding world record holder, National Sailing Champion, National Unicycle Champion, and scores of Ironman distance finishers. In 2004, Disney artist Ron McDonald added a swimming mural to the wall. In 2008, the wall had to be expanded to allow for more names.

== Risks ==
The swim is done at a person's own risk. There are no lifeguards or rescue boats. Participants are expected to be accomplished swimmers: others are told not to swim. Swimmers are encouraged to use a flotation aid such as a pull buoy or wetsuit. Alligators have been seen in the lake at times and some swimmers do swim with knives, but there has never been an alligator attack. Reportedly, a lake cane monster lives in the lake. Although, never photographed, residents and swimmers have reported sightings or feeling the monster brush up against them. All new swimmers to the lake for their first 3 crossings must have flotation with them, no exceptions. This could be in the form of a pull buoy, lifeguard buoy, wetsuit, etc.

== Rewards ==
On completion of a swimmer's first swim, they receive a patch with the logo of the swim, a bumper sticker, and get to sign the wall of fame. On the twenty-fifth crossing swimmers receive a white racing cap with the logo. On the one hundredth crossing, swimmers are inducted into the 100K club, their name is highlighted in yellow on the wall of fame, and they receive a baseball cap with the logo. At 150 crossings, swimmers receive a yellow racing cap, 200 crossings a T-shirt, 500 crossings a silver racing cap, and 1000 crossing a gold racing cap and medallion.

== Statistics ==
- Lake Cane is an 85-acre (340,000 m^{2}) spring fed lake with an average depth of approximately 18 feet (5.5 m). The water temperature ranges from 53 F to 90 F.
- Swimmers from over 40 different countries have completed the swim.
- In 2007, a RHR world record was set by a 50-person relay doing 100 crossings.
- The youngest to complete the swim is Jake Meisenheimer at age 6 and the oldest first time swimmer is Brud Cleaveland Age 92.
- The heaviest person to complete the swim is Joe Mattern, at age 51, weighing 480 lbs., on December 5, 2016. Joe was awarded his white swimming cap by Lucky Meisenheimer on March 15, 2017.
