= Bosphorus Cross Continental Swim =

Popular athletic event in Turkey

Bosphorus Cross-Continental Swim Boğaziçi Kıtalararası Yüzme Yarışı
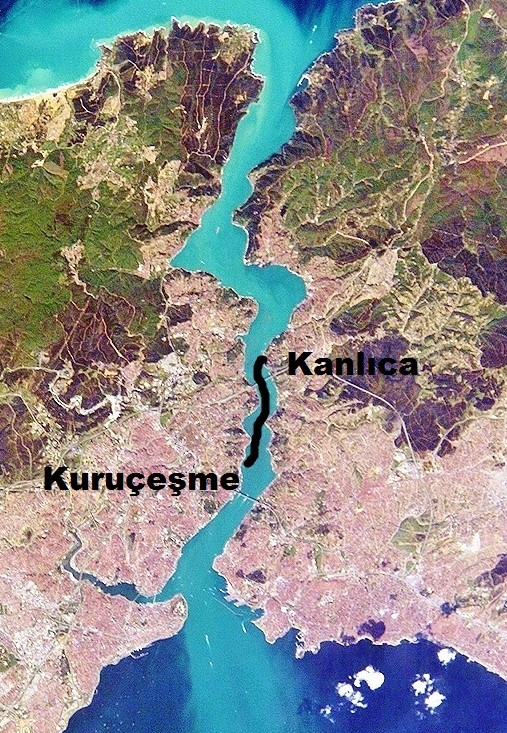
- Course of the Bosphorus Intercontinental Swim in the Istanbul Strait, Turkey.
- Status: Active
- Genre: Sporting event
- Frequency: Annually
- Locations: Bosphorus, Istanbul, Turkey
- Years active: 37
- Inaugurated: July 23, 1989
- Most recent: August 21, 2022
- Participants: 2000+
- Organiser: Turkish Olympic Committee
- Sponsor: Samsung
- Website: bogazici.olimpiyatkomitesi.org.tr

The Bosphorus Cross-Continental Swim (Turkish: Boğaziçi Kıtalararası Yüzme Yarışı) is an annual open water swimming event between the continents Europe and Asia held annually at Bosphorus, Istanbul, Turkey. Established in 1989, the event is organized by the Turkish Olympic Committee and sponsored by Samsung.

== History ==
The event was held for the first time on July 23, 1989 and 64 men and 4 women took part. The next year, the course's start was relocated from Çubuklu to Kanlıca, extending the distance to 6.5 km (4.0 mi). In 1992, the event became international with the participation of 22 swimmers from Czechoslovakia and two from the United States. The course record was set in 2006 by Turkish swimmers Alişan Alaşlı in the men's category with 39:07.11 and Beren Kayrak in the women's category with 40:50.35. Since 2010, every swimmer completing the course receives a certificate titled "Intercontinental Swimmer".

In August 2025, a Russian swimmer, Nikolai Svechnikov, went missing after failing to reach the finish line of the event. His body was subsequently recovered along the Istanbul waterfront in January 2026.

== Notable swimmers ==
Many notable swimmers from all over the world have entered the event during its history. In 2012, American swimmer Mark Spitz, nine-time Olympic champion, and former world record-holder in seven events, was a guest, and performed shows. In 2013, Australian Olympic gold medalist swimmer Ian Thorpe was also a competitor.

Turkish swimmer Fatma Nazan Göğen has taken part every year since the competition's beginning in 1989. Furthermore, Levent Aksüt has been the oldest swimmer so far at the age of 85. Local sportsman Hasan Eskioğlu holds the record for the most victories at ten times, of which seven were in a row.

First swimmer from Russia is Natalya Aleschenko. She took part in 2003 and 2011.

== Participation ==
More than 2,000 swimmers, including over 500 females with half of them being foreigners, from over 50 countries participate at the event. As of 2019, the number of foreign swimmers is limited to 1,200, and only up to 350 are permitted to participate from each country. Rising popularity of the race, especially in Russia and Ukraine, led to a huge rush for slots, with whole international quota being filled in less than an hour after the start of registration in January. There are 12 age categories for each gender, from the age of 14 to 70 and over.

== Course ==
The route starts at the Pier of Kanlıca, north of the Fatih Sultan Mehmet Bridge, in the Asian part of Istanbul, runs southwards, and finishes at Cemil Topuzlu Park in Kuruçeşme, north of the Bosphorus Bridge, in the European part of the city. Hence, the participants swim downstream along the dominant surface current of the Bosphorus. The swimmers are advised to stay in the middle of the strait, to avoid reverse currents that often form in coves along the shores, using coastal landmarks for navigation, and turning to European shore only after passing Galatasaray Islet. Those who miss the finish and are carried by the current below the Bosphorus bridge are disqualified and must enter lifeguards’ boats. Days before the race, introductory boat tours along the route are offered to the contestants, with instruction in Turkish, English and Russian.

== Gallery ==
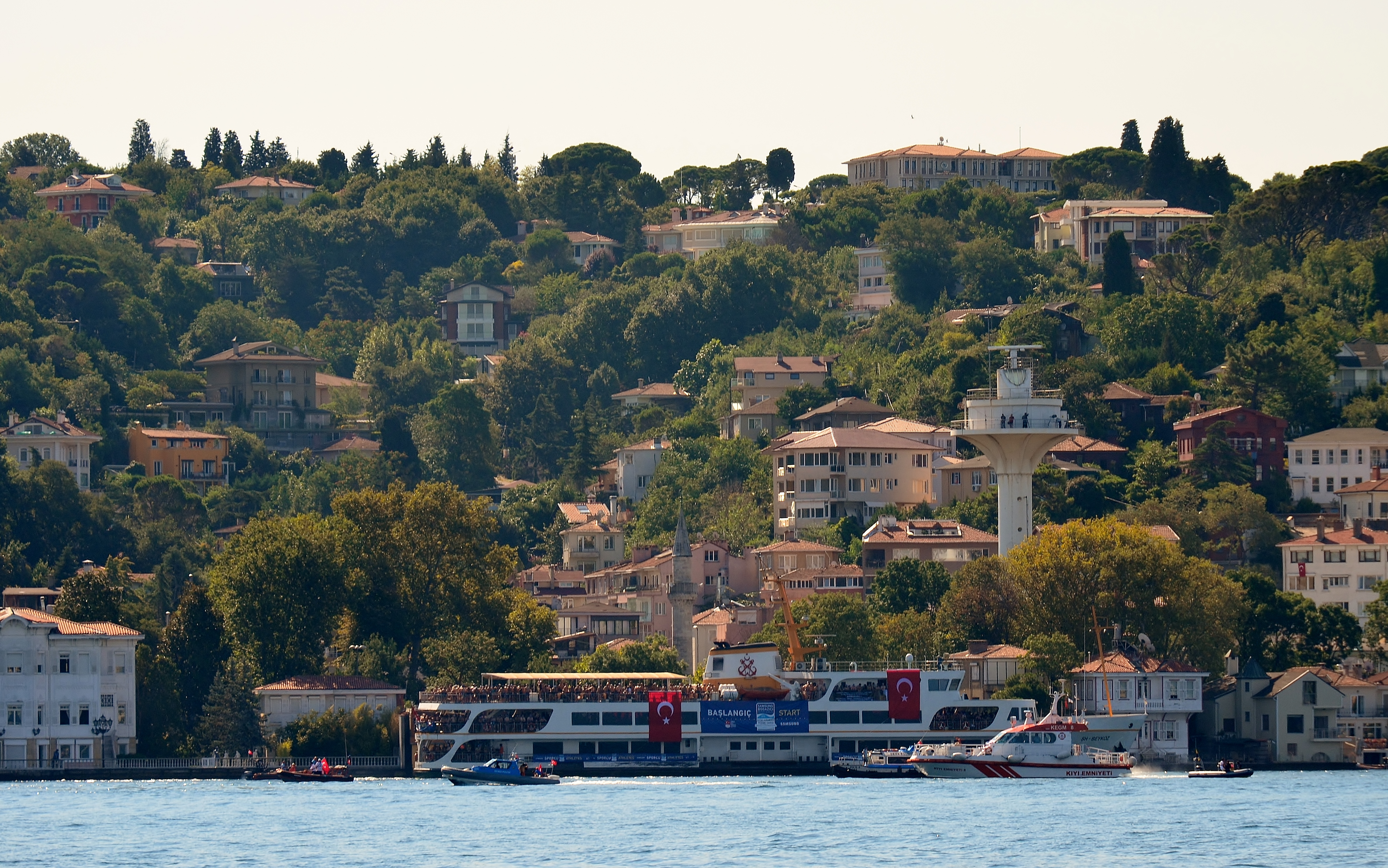
Start of the 2016 Swim from a passenger ferry boat at Kanlıca Pier.

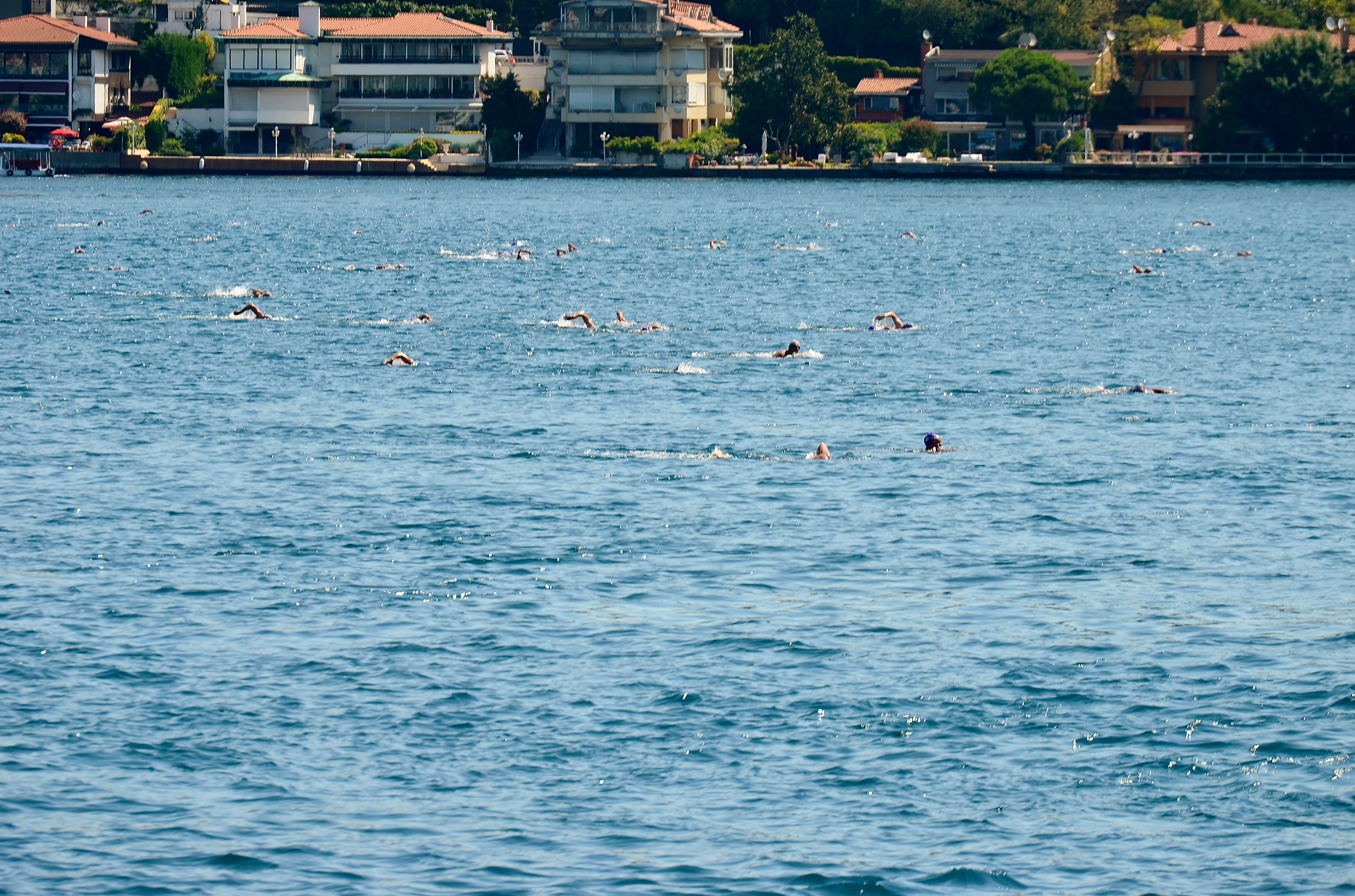
Pack of swimmers at the 2016 Swim.

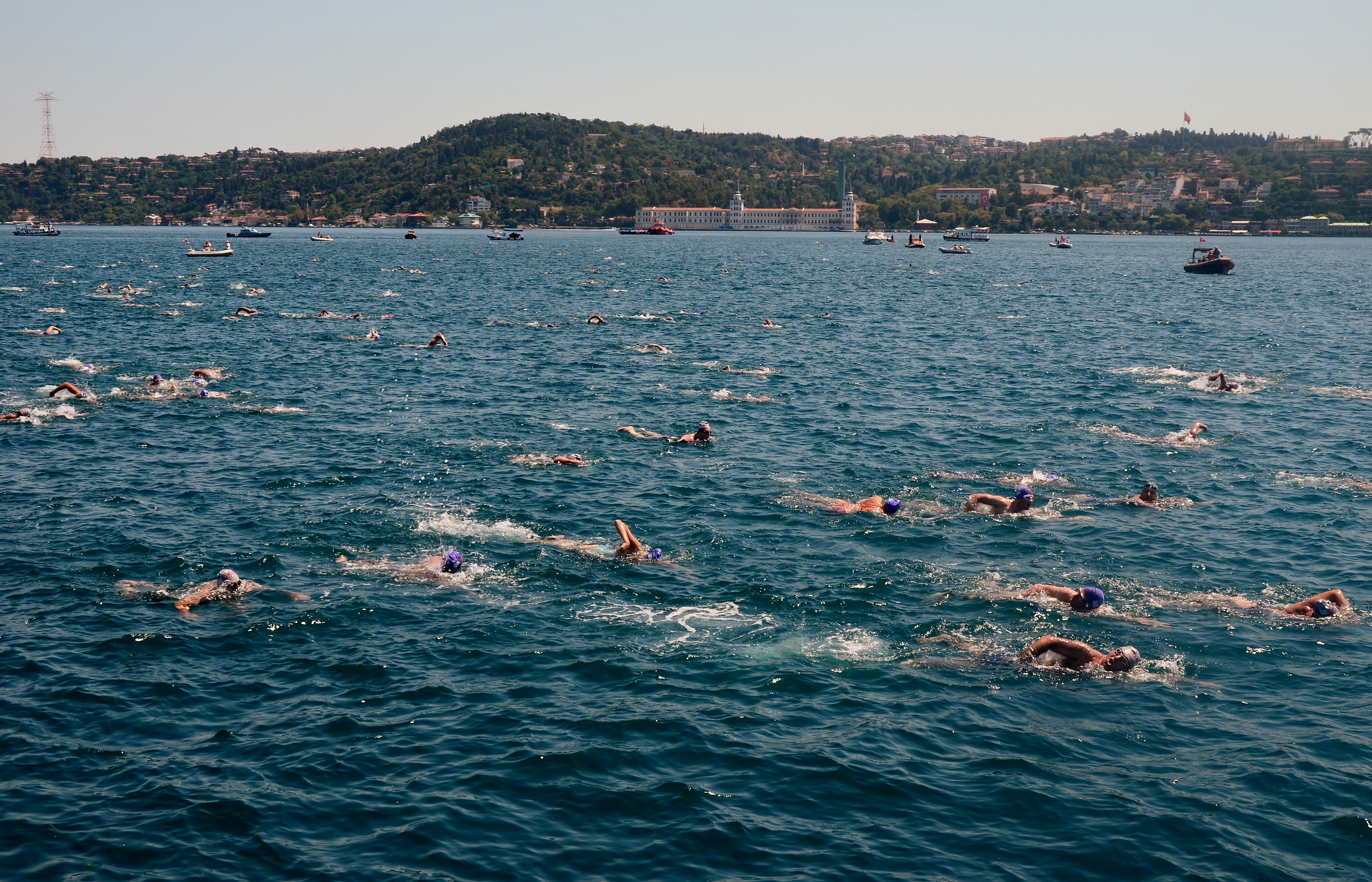
Pack of swimmers at the 2016 Swim.

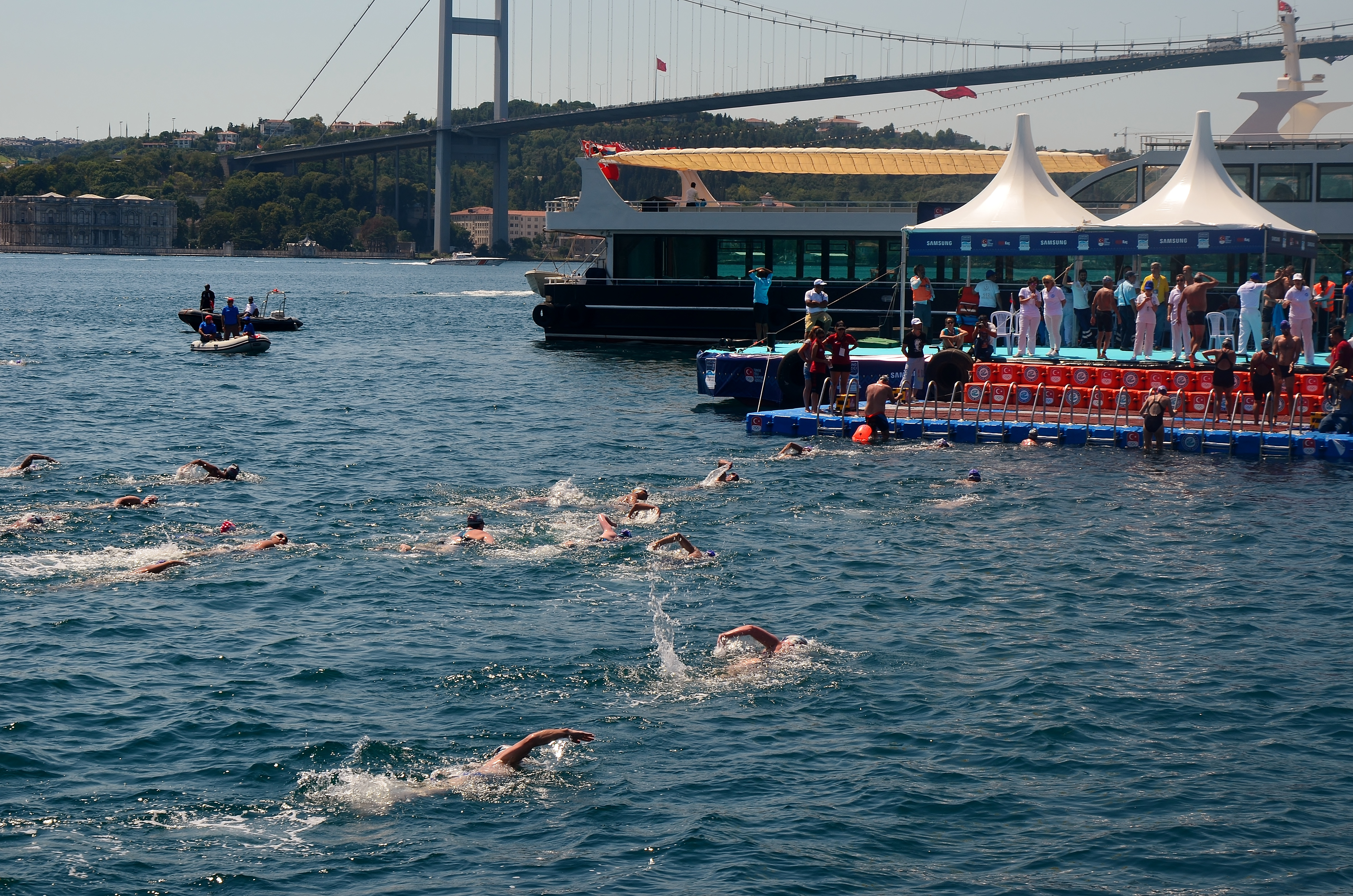
Finish phase of the 2016 Swim at Kuruçeşme.

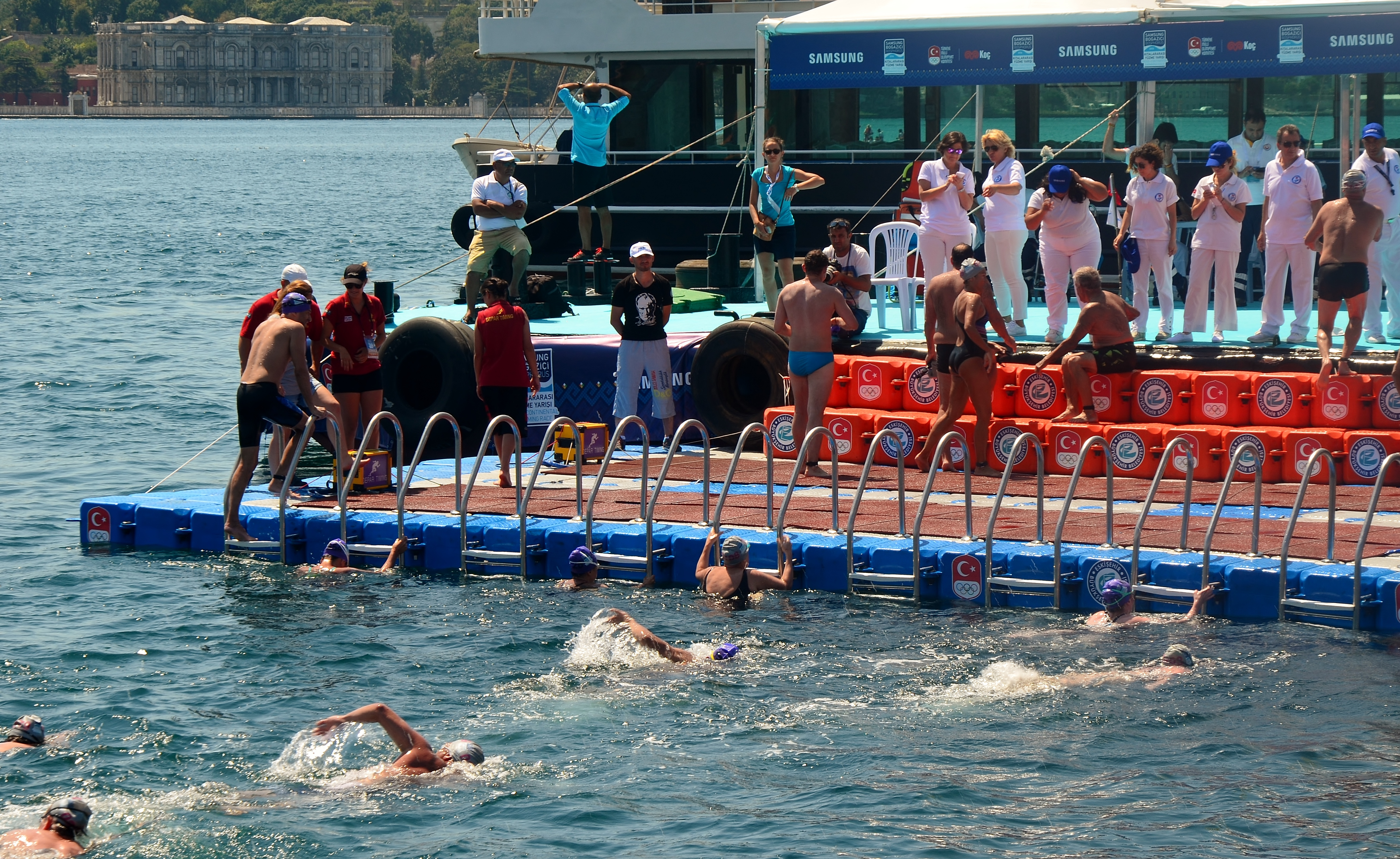
Finish of the 2016 Swim at Kuruçeşme Cemil Topuzlu Park.

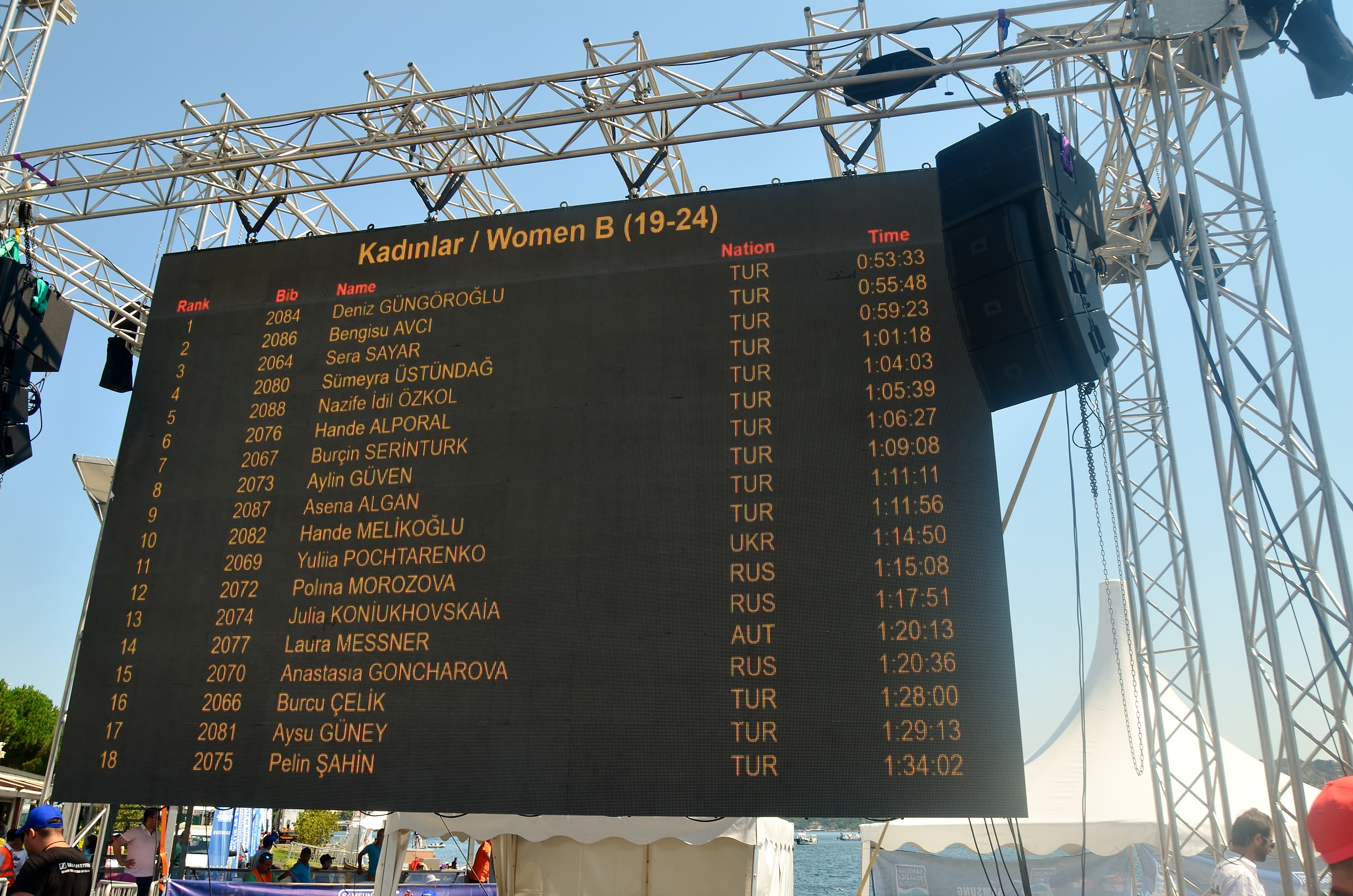
Scoreboard for women's age group 10-24 at the 2016 Swim.

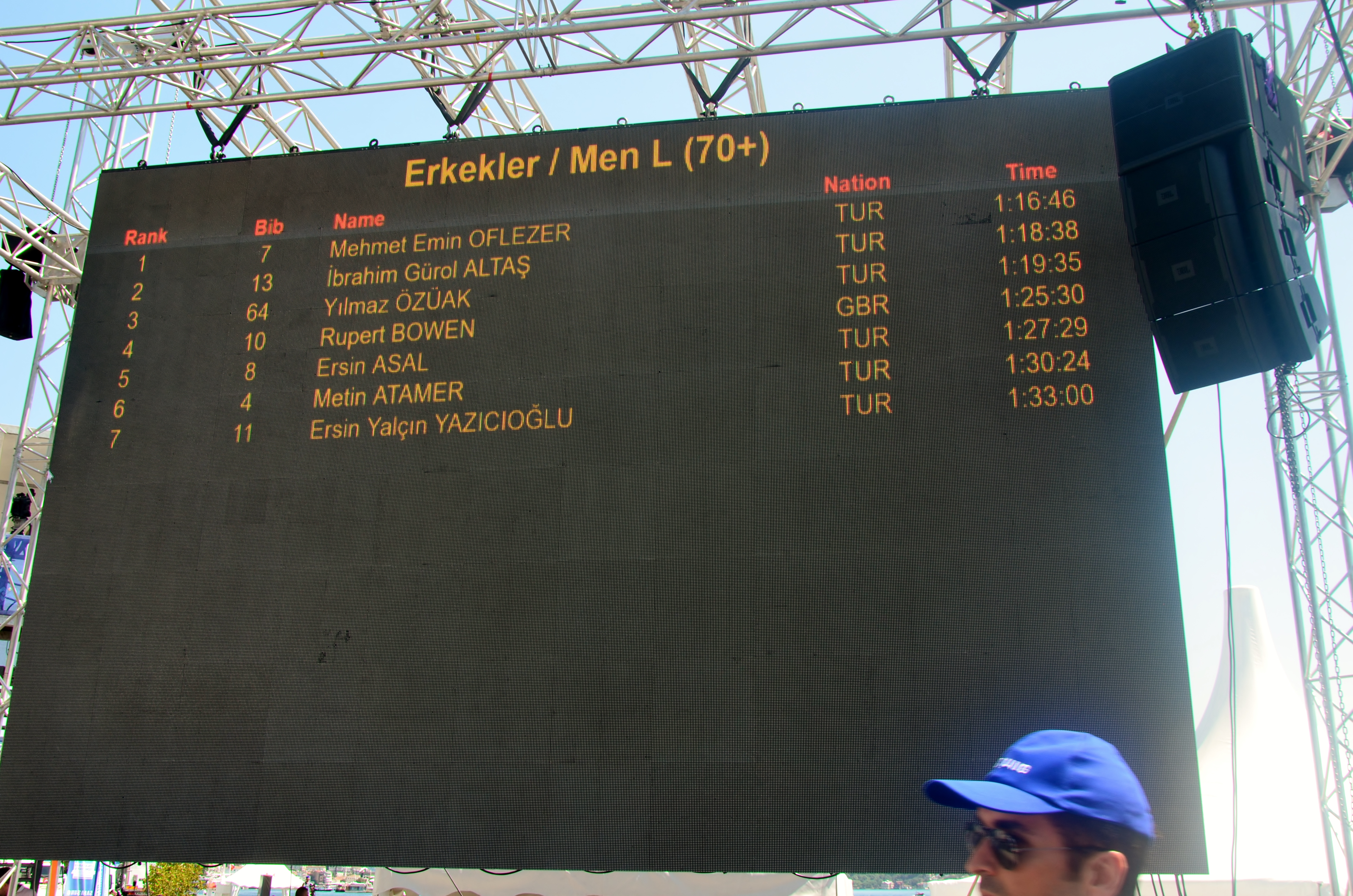
Scoreboard for men's age group 70+ at the 2016 Swim.

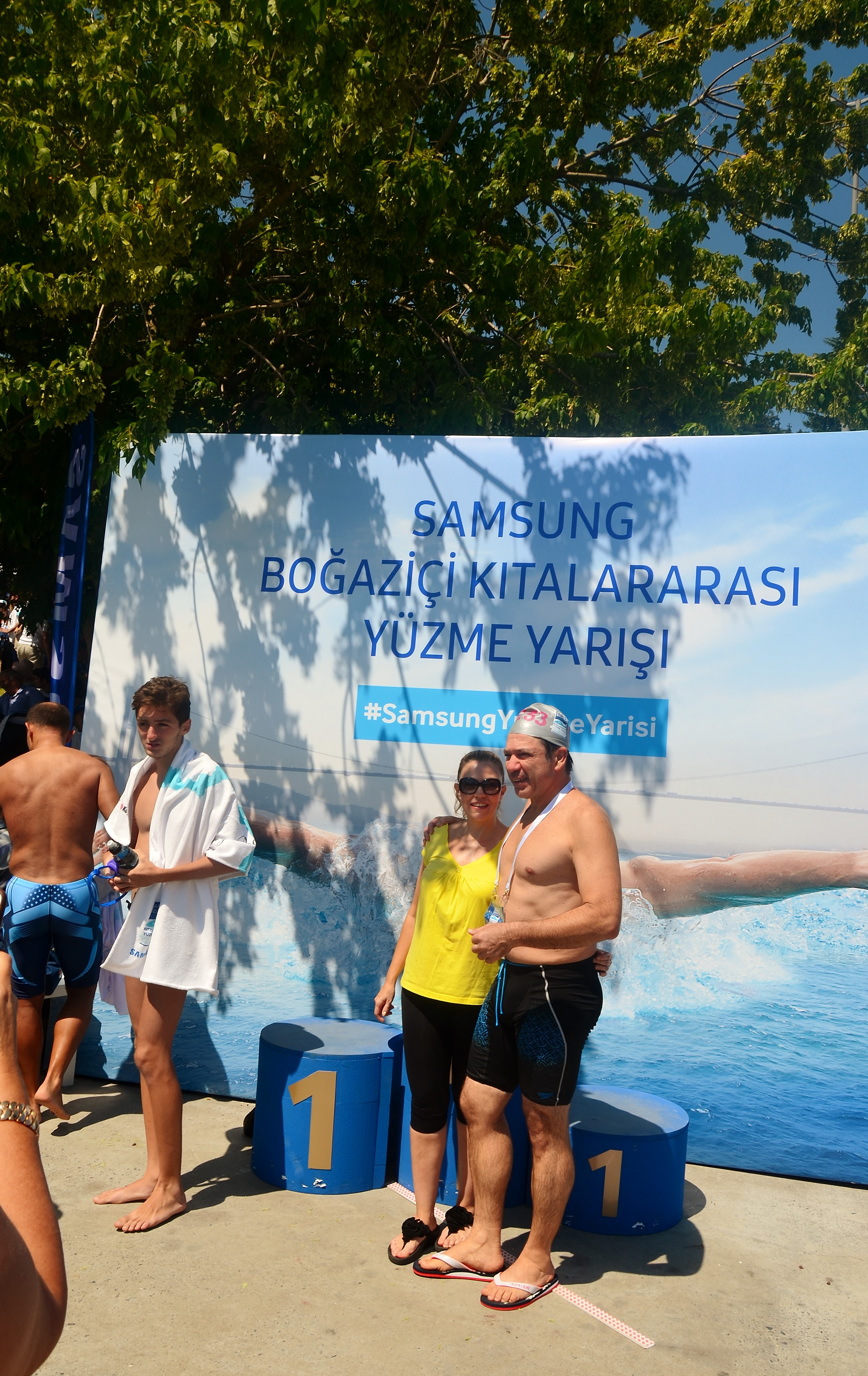
A competitor after finish at the 2016 Swim.

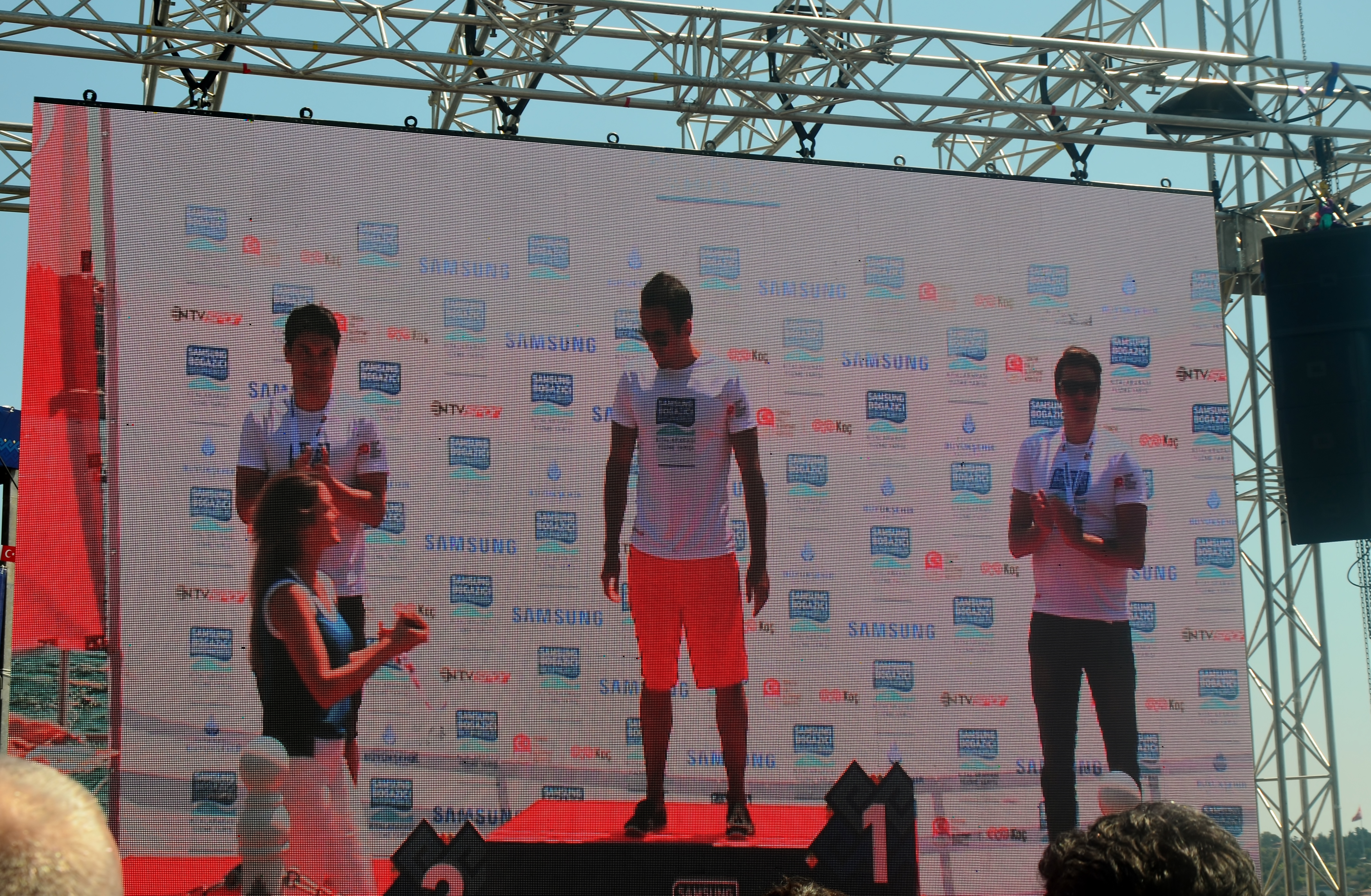
Medalists on the podium at the 2016 Swim seen on the mega screen.
