= John L. Meisenheimer =

American chemist

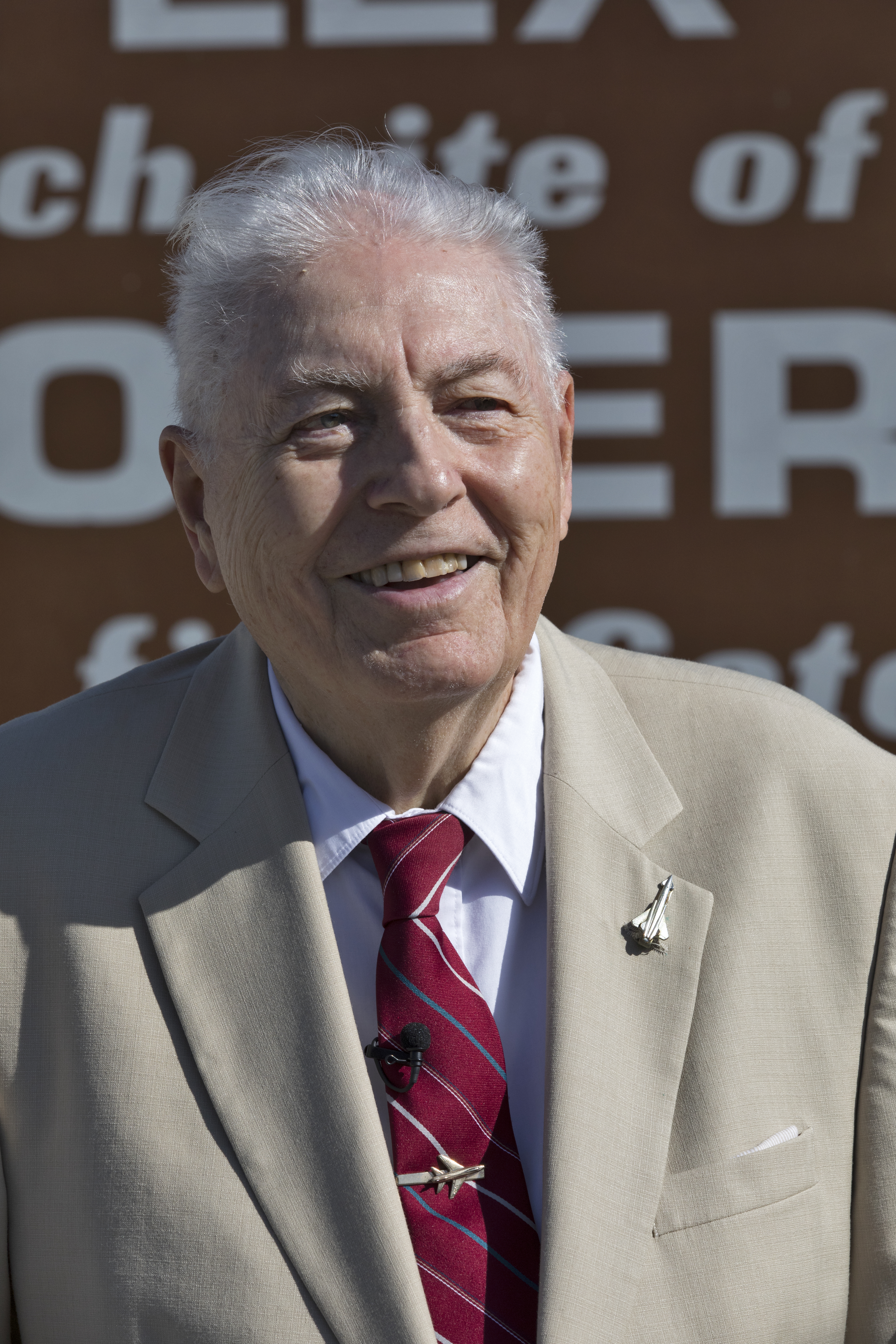

John Long Meisenheimer Sr. (June 21, 1933 – January 7, 2023) was an American chemist who was a Professor Emeritus of Chemistry (1963–1999) and EKU Foundation Professor (1994–1996) at Eastern Kentucky University.

On October 31, 1957, he was the Launch and Flight Weather Officer for the first U.S., intercontinental missile (Snark). In 1958, as the Launch Weather Officer for Explorer 1, the first U.S. satellite, he delayed America's entry into the Space Race for two days with his correct forecasts of extreme upper air wind shear. On the third day, January 31, his forecast was for the jet stream to move far enough away from Cape Canaveral for the upper air winds to allow an evening launch. Dr. Kurt Debus, the launch director, accepted this forecast and ordered the missile to be fueled. At about 10:48 pm, Explorer 1 was successfully launched.

From 1964 to 1970 he was a member of the Commonwealth of Kentucky's Longrifle Team that competed against teams from other states. Because of his participation in this competition he was commissioned an Honorary Kentucky Colonel in 1967 by Governor Edward Breathitt. In 1969 he won the Indiana Open Flintlock Championship competing against marksmen from six states. In 1992 he saved lives by discovering radioactive depleted uranium was used in the manufacture of frizzens used in muzzle-loading flintlock rifles.

He plays a recurring role of Pappy 5X in the book and webisode series the Zombie Cause. His biography is in the 2021 edition of Who'sWho In America,

Meisenheimer died from transthyretin amyloid cardiomyopathy on January 7, 2023, at the age of 89.
