= Open water swimming =

Swimming sport

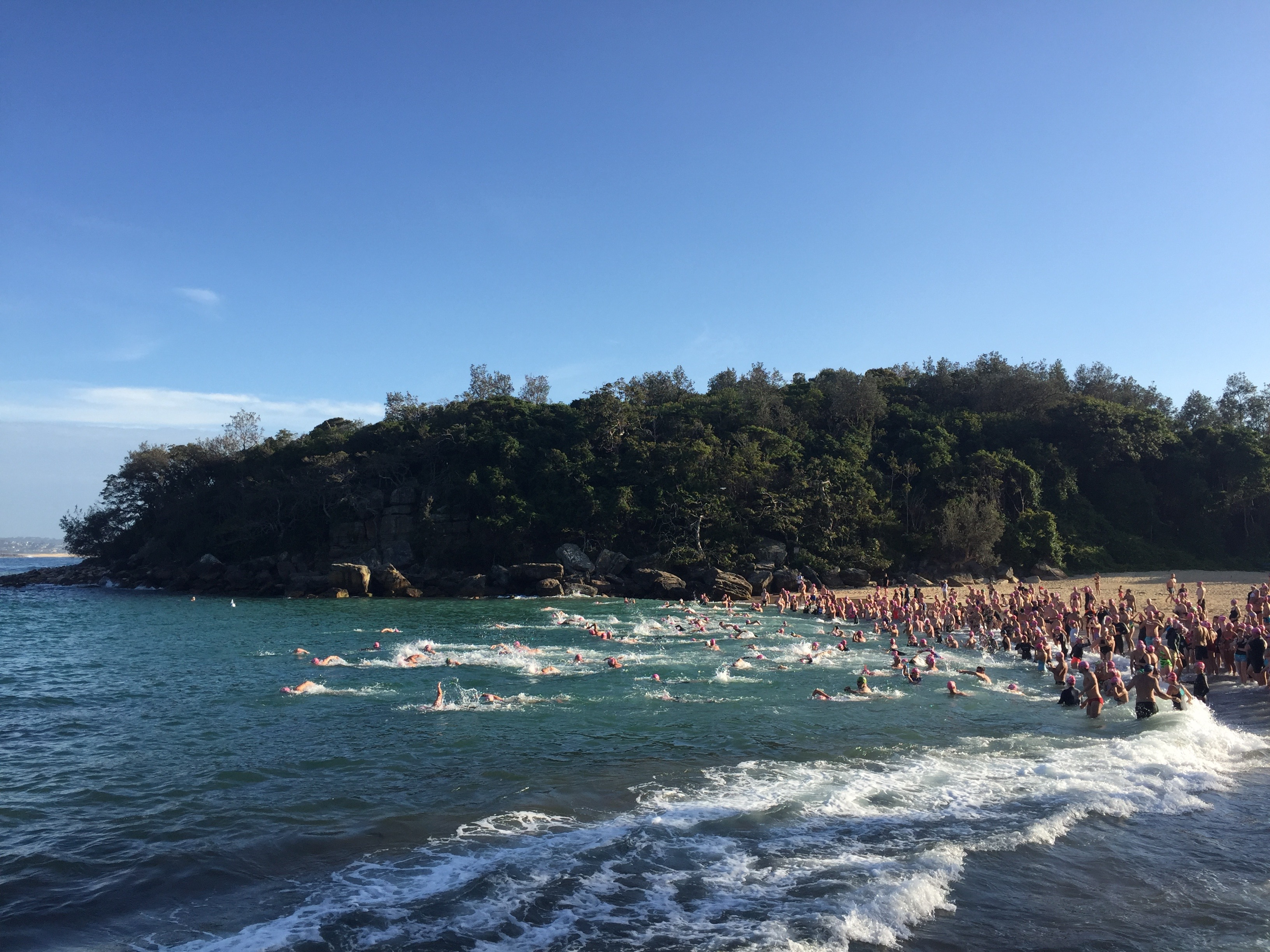
The start of an amateur ocean swim event on Christmas morning 2016, at Manly Beach, Australia

Open water swimming is a swimming discipline which takes place in outdoor bodies of water such as open oceans, lakes, and rivers. Competitive open water swimming is governed by the International Swimming Federation, World Aquatics (formerly known as FINA), except when it is part of multi-sport events, which are governed by the World Triathlon. Non-competitive open water swimming may be called wild swimming.

In the first edition of the modern Olympic Games in Athens in 1896, the swimming competition was held in open water. In 2000, the Olympic Games first included a triathlon with a 1500 m swim leg, and in 2008, a 10 km open water swim. The FINA World Aquatics Championships has featured open water swimming events since 1992. The FINA World Open Water Swimming Championships was held from 2000 to 2010. Since 2007, the FINA 10 km Marathon Swimming World Cup is held in several events around the world.

Events such as the Midmar Mile in South Africa (attributed to Wayne Ridden), the Great Swim in the UK (whose idea is attributed to Colin Hill), and the Batley race have helped create and grow interest and participation in the sport.

== Racing techniques ==
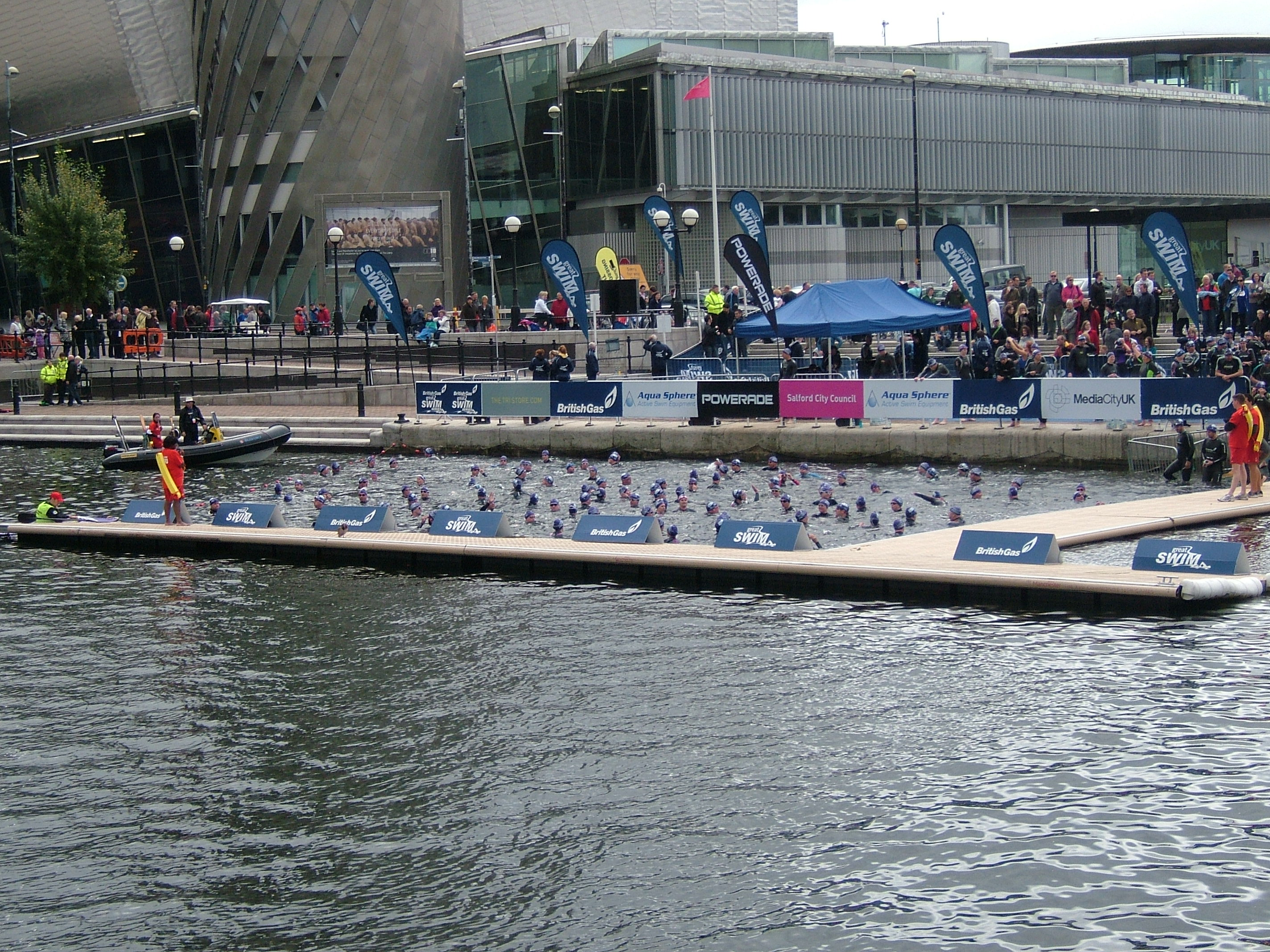
Acclimatisation to the 14.5 °C (58.1 °F) water at Salford Quays in September 2010

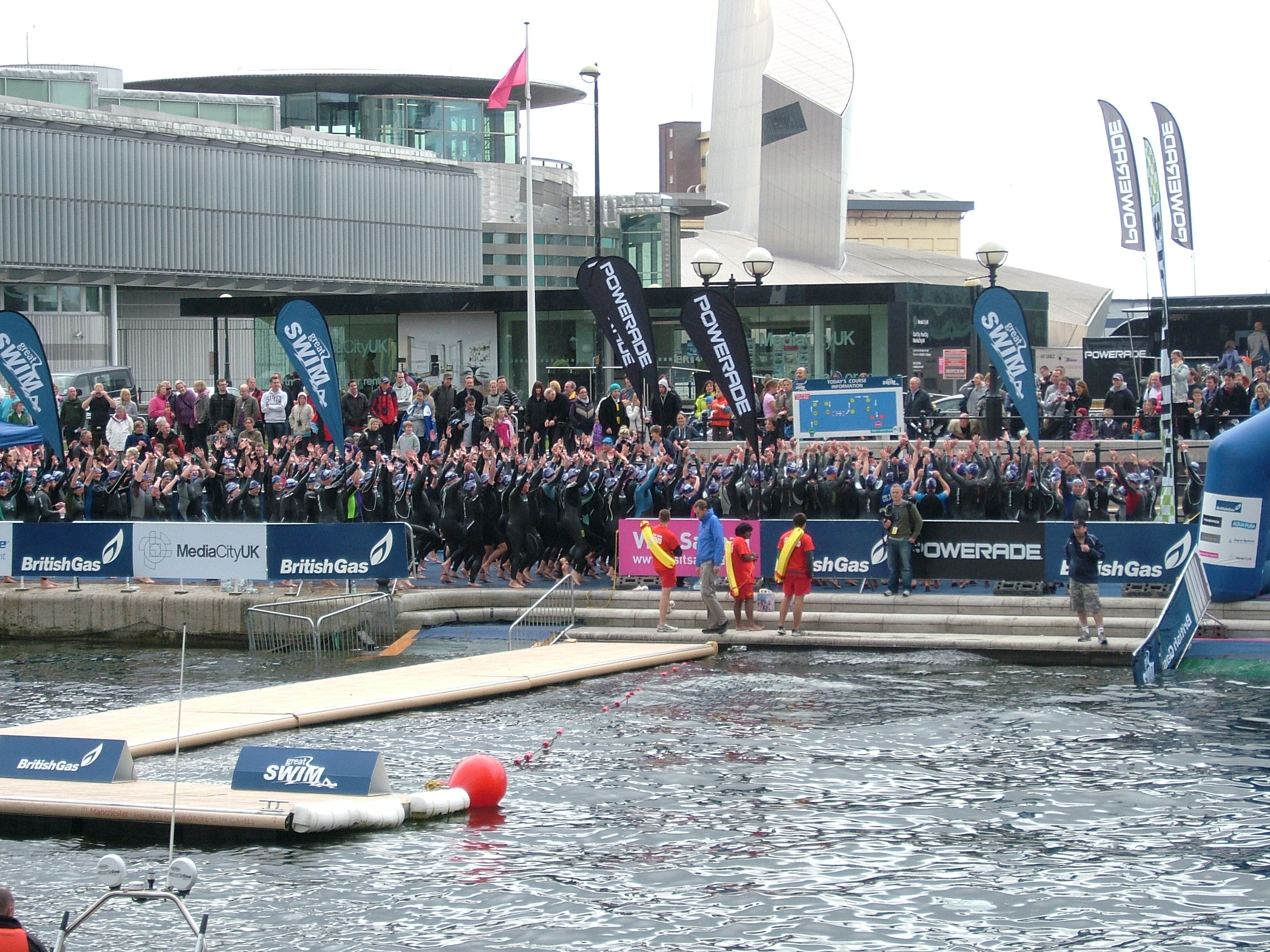
Warm-up exercises

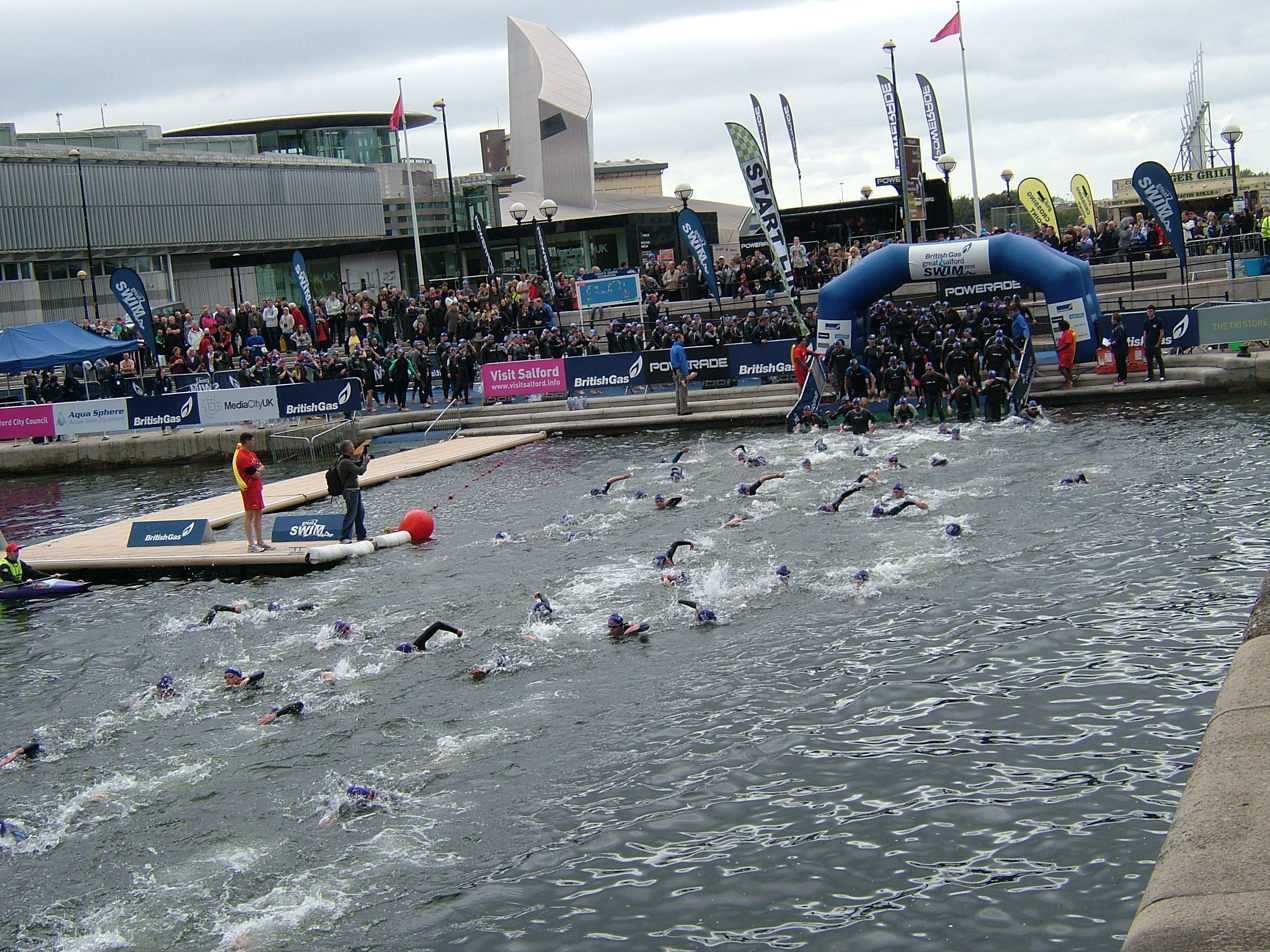
Swimmers beginning a one-mile (1.6 km) course

=== Stroke ===
Though most open water races do not require a specific stroke, most competitors employ the front crawl, also known as freestyle. The efficiency of this stroke was demonstrated by Gertrude Ederle, who, as the first woman to swim the English Channel, employed it to beat the existing world record by more than 2 hours.

=== Sighting ===
When covering large distances, swimmers may head off course due to current, waves, wind, and poor visibility. Typically, buoys are stationed periodically across a large expanse to provide guidance. However, buoys are often invisible due to interference from choppy water and reduced visibility through goggles. Swimmers are encouraged to 'triangulate' by looking for two aligned, easily visible objects on land that are directly behind the destination (such as the end of a pier as it lines up with a hilltop), and to make sure they continue to appear aligned during the race.

=== Drafting ===
Drafting, which is prohibited by some race regulations, is the technique of following another swimmer so closely that water resistance is reduced. When swimming closely alongside or behind a swimmer in the lead swimmer's wake, resistance is reduced and the amount of effort to swim at the same speed is correspondingly reduced. In calmer conditions, or when facing surface chop, swimmers can also significantly benefit from swimming immediately behind or closely alongside a swimmer of comparable or faster speed. Not all race organizers permit drafting, and swimmers can run the risk of disqualification if they are caught.

=== Beach starting/exiting ===
When entering the water, swimmers can use techniques to take advantage of the shallow water. One such technique is walking along the bottom. Another technique is "dolphining", which involves diving down to the bottom and launching oneself upwards and forwards. This technique can also help to avoid incoming waves. When exiting the water, swimmers can body surf to take advantage of waves.

== Equipment used in competitions ==
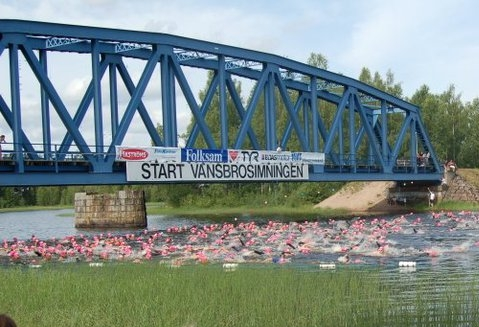
Start at Vansbro

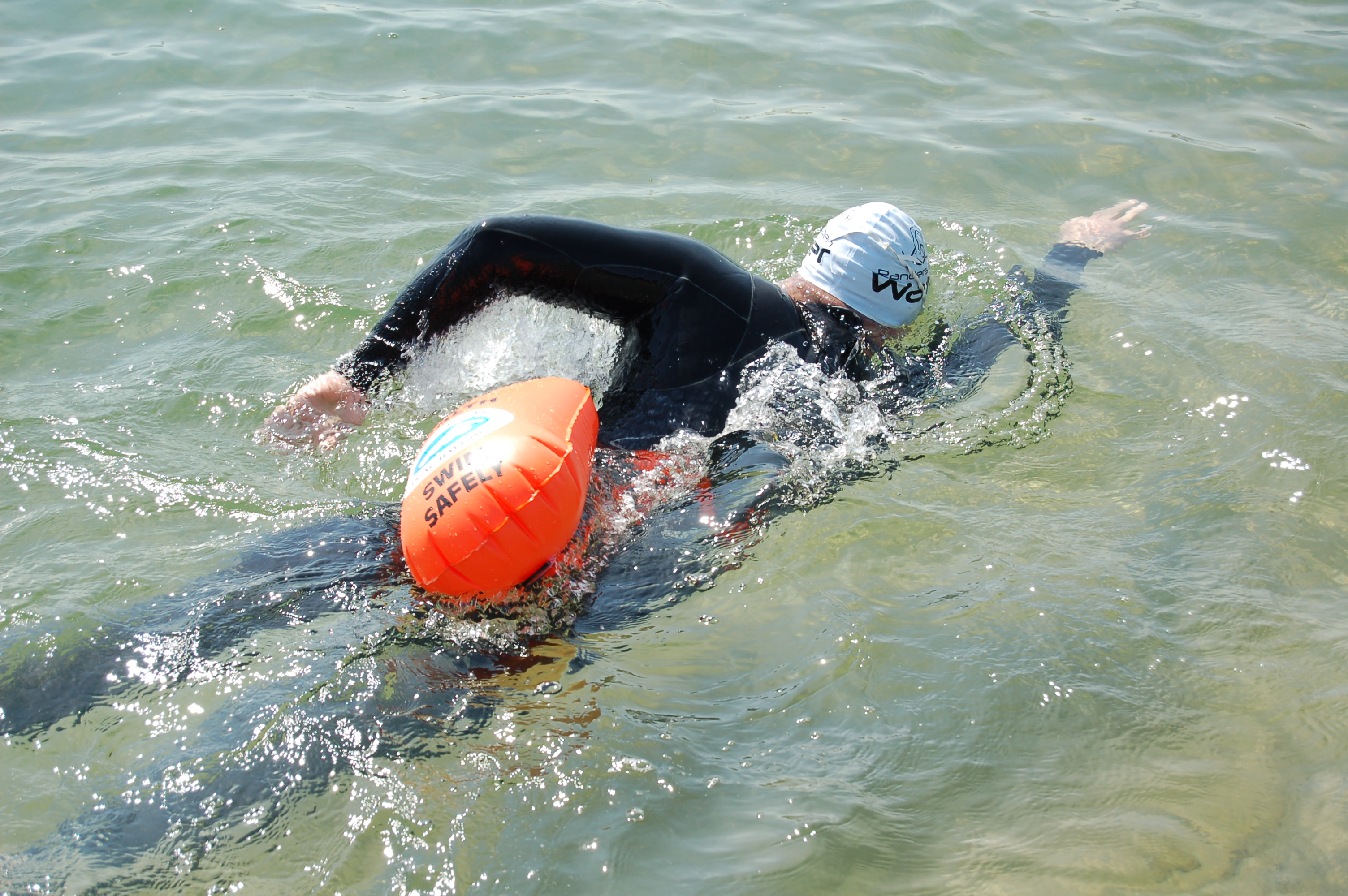
In some competitions, a swim buoy is used for extra visibility.

The equipment allowed in a race depends on the sanctioning body and/or the race organizers. For example, races may have divisions for wetsuits and/or relays; may require escort boats / kayakers / paddleboards; and may require specifically colored swim caps. Some swimmers tend to keep it simple, using a basic swimsuit, goggles, and swim cap. Many records are based on that attire, which is known as 'channel attire' because it is stipulated in the rules for English Channel crossings and the rules for other long swims. Swimmers often utilize changing robes to dry off and change into or out of their swimwear attire in often cold and public places.

=== Wetsuit usage ===
For triathlons, competitive rule 4.4 of USA Triathlon, states that "each age group participant shall be permitted to wear a wetsuit without penalty in any event sanctioned by USA Triathlon up to and including a water temperature of 78 degrees Fahrenheit (26 °C)." The ITU rule is that wetsuits are allowed for elite triathlons at below 23 °C (73 °F) if 3,000 metres (9,800 ft) or more, and below 21 °C (70 °F) if shorter. Wetsuits are mandatory in triathlons below 16 °C (61 °F) if 3,000 metres (9,800 ft) or more.

Various types of wetsuits of varying thicknesses are used in open water swimming. Some employ high-tech materials and workmanship, others are of basic materials found in surfing and diving wetsuits. Some designs cover the torso, arms and legs, while other designs leave the arms and shoulders exposed.

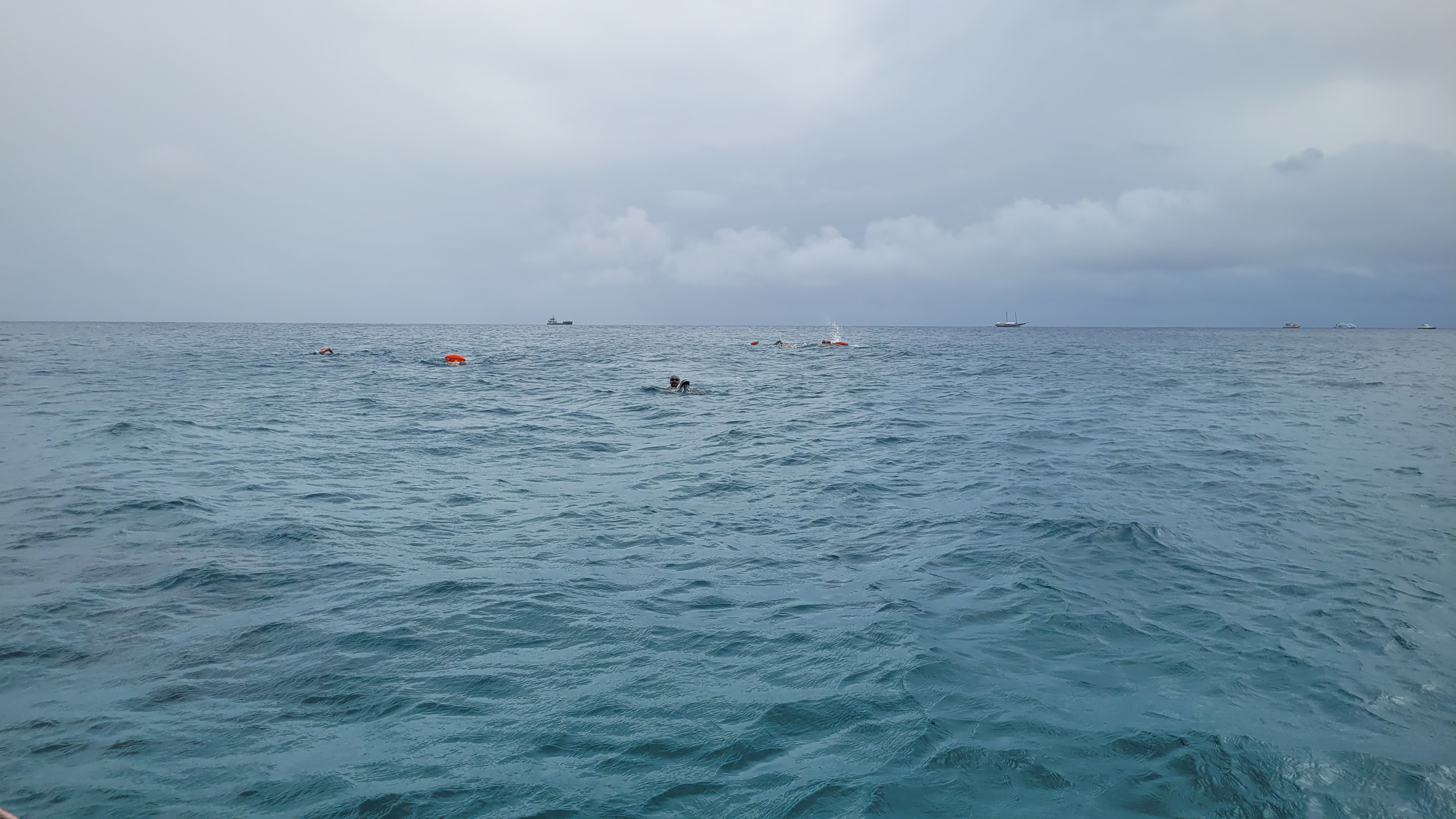
The swim buoys increase visibility of the swimmers.

When a person floats motionless in the water, their legs tend to sink. When a person swims freestyle, the legs rise toward surface because water passing underneath the body pushes the legs up, similar to how the wind can lift a kite into the air. In addition, a proper kicking technique will bring the legs all the way to the surface, creating a more streamlined profile for the arms to pull through the water. Both of these mechanisms of becoming horizontal require a small amount of energy from the swimmer. When a person wearing a thick wetsuit floats motionless in the water, their legs tend to float on the surface. Theoretically, this obviates the small energy expenditure mentioned above, although an additional small amount of energy is required to continually flex the wetsuit during swimming motions.

High-end triathlon wetsuits have extra flexibility that provides easier range of motion than a surfing or diving wetsuit. Some triathlon wetsuits have varied thickness by way of panels that provide custom flotation that aids the wearer in keeping an efficient position in the water.

== Types of open water swimming ==
- Ice swimming
- Long distance swimming
- Marathon swimming
- Winter swimming

== Recreational open-water swimming ==
Swimming in lakes, rivers and the sea, often called wild swimming, has become increasingly popular in the United Kingdom since the early 2020s. This has led to public awareness of issues of water quality in these bodies of water, some of which are registered as bathing places under the Bathing Water Regulations 2013 or are Blue Flag Beaches.

It has been suggested that wild swimming can improve both physical and mental health, although it can also offer risks.

== Competitions ==
- Bosphorus Intercontinental Swim, (Turkey, Istanbul)
- Pier to Pub (Australia, Victoria, Lorne)
- Cole Classic word's largest ocean swim (Australia, Manly)
- Lake Zurich Swim (Switzerland, Lake Zurich)
- Rottnest Channel Swim (Australia, Rottnest Island)
- Cadiz Freedom Swim (South Africa)
- Meis–Kaş Swim, in the Mediterranean Sea between Greece and Turkey
- Round the Castle Swim in the canals of downtown (Denmark, Copenhagen)
- Vansbrosimningen 7,800 participants (Sweden, Vansbro)
- Whitehaven Beach Ocean Swim (Australia Whitsunday)
- The Great Swim Series (United Kingdom, Windermere)
- Swim Miami (United States, Miami)
- Santa Fe-Coronda Marathon (Argentina, Santa Fe)

Open water swimming is an Olympic-sanctioned discipline. It has been included in the Olympic Games since 2008, and the FINA World Aquatics Championships since 1991.

== See also ==
- Cole Classic
- List of successful English Channel swimmers
- Lucky's Lake Swim
- Roger Deakin
- Triathlon
