= List of Masters world records in swimming =

The Masters world records in swimming are ratified by FINA, the international governing body of swimming. Records can be set by registered Masters competitors. The minimum age is 25 years in long course (50 metres) or short course (25 metres) swimming pools.

== Long course ==
=== Men ===
Key: Awaiting ratification

==== Freestyle ====
Age group	Record		Athlete	Club	Date	Age	Meet	Place	Ref	
Men's 50m freestyle
25-29	22.30		Ari-Pekka Liukkonen (FIN)		18 February 2017	28 years, 9 days				
30-34	22.13		Roland Schoeman (RSA)		13 July 2013	33 years, 10 days	Arizona Masters Championships	Phoenix, United States		
35-39	22.72		Stefano Razeto (GER)	ST Erzgebirge	1 June 2024	38 years, 85 days	German Masters Championships	Stuttgart, Germany		
40-44	23.14		Andrei Kurnosov (RUS)	Russia	8 August 2023	41 years, 124 days	World Masters Championships	Fukuoka, Japan		
45-49	23.55		Hideaki Hara (JAP)	Japan	15 August 2019	45 years, 64 days	World Masters Championships	Gwangju, South Korea		
50-54	24.08		Brent Barnes (USA)		27 June 2009					
55-59	24.45		Brent Barnes (USA)		19 July 2015		Japan Masters	Tokyo, Japan		
60-64	24.82		Calvin Maughan (RSA)		1 March 2024					
65-69	26.19		Brent Barnes (JPN)		6 July 2024					
70-74	27.12		Doug Martin (CAN)	Little Rock Masters	20 January 2023	70	First Chance Invitational	Little Rock, United States		
75-79	29.19		David Quiggin (USA)		25 August 2019					
80-84	31.96		Roberto Alberiche (ESP)		20 May 2012					
85-89	33.94		Keijiro Nakamura (JPN)		2 March 2008					
90-94	40.72		Woody Bowersock (USA)		11 August 2003					
95-99	45.71		Willard Lamb (USA)		6 August 2017					
100-104	56.12		George Corones (AUS)		28 February 2018	99 years, 328 days	Australian Championships	Gold Coast, Australia		
Men's 100m freestyle
25-29	48.72		Vladislav Grinev (RUS)		26 May 2023	26 years, 309 days				
30-34	49.80		Darian Townsend (RSA)	Arizona Masters	28 August 1984	31 years, 330 days	23 July 2016			
35-39	50.55		Cameron Owen (USA)				24 January 2025	First Chance Long Course Invitational	Little Rock, United States	
40-44	50.73		Filippo Magnini	Italy		2 February 1982	41 years, 148 days	30 June 2023		
45-49	52.24		Hideaki Hara	Japan		1 August 1956	63 years, 12 days (Note: doubtful)	13 August 2019		
50-54	53.04		Hideaki Hara	Japan		1 August 1956	68 years, 37 days (Note: doubtful)	7 September 2024		
55-59	55.76		Mark Thompson	Australia				7 April 2024		
60-64	57.39		Calvin Maughan	United States				18 May 2024		
65-69	59.49		Jack Groselle	United States				9 August 2019		
70-74	1:03.32		David Quiggin	United States			71	8 August 2015		
75-79	1:06.40		Akira Fujimaki	Japan				3 March 2018		
80-84	1:11.82		David Radcliff	United States		1 May 1934	80 years, 114 days	23 August 2014		
85-89	1:22.55		Hiroshi Matsumoto	Japan				21 November 2021		
90-94	1:36.05		Katsura Suzuki	Japan				26 June 2022		
95-99	1:47.59		Willard Lamb	United States				26 August 2017		
100-104	2:15.99		Willard Lamb	United States				7 August 2022		
Men's 200m freestyle
25-29	1:50.76		David Alcolado Durango (ESP)	Ucam Fuensanta	16 August 2017	27	World Masters Championships	Budapest		
30-34	1:49.56		Darian Townsend	South Africa	Arizona Masters	28 August 1984	31 years, 285 days	8 June 2016		
35-39	1:51.84		Shogo Hirara	Japan				7 August 2023		
40-44	1:53.65		Vladimir Pyshnenko	United States		25 March 1970	40 years, 130 days	2 August 2010		
45-49	1:55.39		R. Rocha Castro	Brazil				25 November 2023		
50-54	1:58.62		Nicolas Granger	France				7 January 2017		
55-59	2:04.01		Michael Mann	United States				26 July 2009		
60-64	2:07.68		Dan Stephenson	United States			60	6 August 2017		
65-69	2:09.39		Rick Colella	United States		14 December 1951	65 years, 235 days	6 August 2017		
70-74	2:23.30		Fred Schlicher	United States				31 July 2018		
75-79	2:25.66		David Radcliff	United States		1 May 1934	75 years, 36 days	6 June 2009		
80-84	2:40.22		David Radcliff	United States		1 May 1934	80 years, 115 days	24 August 2014		
85-89	3:03.50		Roberto Alberiche	Spain				1 July 2017		
90-94	3:33.64		Katsura Suzuki	Japan				12 December 2021		
95-99	4:04.60		Willard Lamb	United States				26 August 2017		
100-104	5:18.86		Willard Lamb	United States				3 August 2022		
Men's 400m freestyle
25-29	4:00.96		Alexander Fedororov (RUS)		5 June 2022					
30-34	3:58.12		Darian Townsend	United States		28 August 1984	31 years, 330 days	23 July 2016		
35-39	4:00.78		Irakli Revishvili	United Arab Emirates	All Stars Sports Center	3 November 1989	35 years, 117 days	28 February 2024	World Masters Championships	Doha, Qatar
40-44	4:06.74		Erik Hochstein	United States		1 October 1968	40 years, 296 days	24 July 2009		
45-49	4:09.66		R. Rocha Castro	Brazil				24 November 2023		
50-54	4:15.93		Nicolas Granger	United States				4 August 2017		
55-59	4:22.49		Michael Mann	United States				25 July 2009		
60-64	4:30.15		J. Carlos Vallejo	Spain				19 June 2023		
65-69	4:37.70		Rick Colella	United States		14 December 1951	65 years, 233 days	4 August 2017		
70-74	5:03.56		Dan Kirkland	United States				4 August 2018		
75-79	5:17.77		David Radcliff	United States		1 May 1934	74 years, 310 days	7 March 2009		
80-84	5:45.21		David Radcliff	United States		1 May 1934	81 years, 114 days	23 August 2015		
85-89	6:38.87		Graham Johnston	United States		10 July 1930	85 years, 352 days	26 June 2016		
90-94	7:39.24		Katsura Suzuki	Japan				12 December 2021		
95-99	8:43.18		Willard Lamb	United States				25 August 2017		
100-104	10:55.25		Willard Lamb	United States				3 August 2022		
Men's 800m freestyle
25-29	8:24.46	†	David Heron (USA)		12 August 2022					
30-34	8:08.53	†	Jan Wolfgarten	Germany		17 March 1982	29 years, 360 days	11 March 2012		
35-39	8:17.65		Irakli Revishvili	United Arab Emirates	All Stars Sports Center	3 November 1989	35 years, 115 days	26 February 2024	World Masters Championships	Doha, Qatar
40-44	8:35.85		Nicola Nisato	Italy				12 August 2019		
45-49	8:40.79		Fabio Calmasini	Italy	Team Sport Isola			10 August 2015	World Championships	Kazan, Russia
50-54	8:55.05		Marcus Mattioli	Brazil		18 October 1960	49 years, 286 days	31 July 2010		
55-59	9:00.09		Michael Mann	United States				24 July 2009		
60-64	9:21.08		Arnaldo Perez	Puerto Rico		28 October 1958	63 years, 204 days	20 May 2022		
65-69	9:48.95		Djan Madruga	Brazil		7 December 1958	64 years, 239 days	3 August 2023		
70-74										
75-79										
80-84	11:51.43	†	David Radcliff	United States		1 May 1934	80 years, 31 days	1 June 2014	Sizzling Summer" Masters Meet	Beaverton, Oregon
85-89										
90-94	16:28.37		Willard Lamb	United States			91	9 August 2013	USA Masters Championships	Mission Viejo, California
95-99										
100-104										
Men's 1500m freestyle
25-29	15:49.04		David Heron (USA)		12 August 2022					
30-34	15:25.79		Jan Wolfgarten	Germany		17 March 1982	29 years, 360 days	11 March 2012		
35-39	16:00.04		Petar Stoychev	Bulgaria		24 October 1976	35 years, 139 days	11 March 2012		
40-44	16:24.76		Nicola Nisato	Italy				7 April 2018		
45-49	16:38.81		Jeff Erwin	United States				10 August 2009		
50-54	17:08.33		Jim McConica	United States	Ventura County Masters	19 December 1950	49 years, 245 days	20 August 2000		
55-59	17:22.61		Michael Mann	United States				10 August 2009		
60-64	17:55.91		Arnaldo Perez	Puerto Rico		28 October 1958	63 years, 279 days	3 August 2022		
65-69	18:43.53		Paul Blackbeard	Australia				15 October 2023		
70-74	20:17.22		Richard Baughman	United States	New England Masters	6 August 2025		U.S. Masters Summer National Championships	San Antonio, United States	
75-79										
80-84	22:16.90		David Radcliff	United States		1 May 1934	80 years, 31 days	1 June 2014	Sizzling Summer" Masters Meet	Beaverton, Oregon
85-89										
90-94	31:12.82		Willard Lamb	United States			92	1 June 2014	Sizzling Summer" Masters Meet	Beaverton, Oregon
95-99										
100-104										

==== Backstroke ====
Age group	Record	Athlete	Club	Date	Age	Meet	Place	Ref	
Men's 50m backstroke
25-29	25.44	Anton Butymov (RUS)		3 April 2016					
30-34	25.53	Sergey Fesikov	Russia		21 January 1989	34 years, 246 days	24 September 2023		
35-39	25.76	Stefano Razeto	Germany	ST Erzgebirge	1986	38	2 June 2024	German Masters Championships	Stuttgart, Germany
40-44	27.10	Matthew Clay	Great Britain		27 October 1982	41 years, 176 days	20 April 2024		
45-49	27.56	Marcin Kaczmarek	Poland		25 June 1977	45 years, 344 days	4 June 2023		
50-54	28.20	M. Gromov-Ivanov	Russia				28 May 2023		
55-59	28.54	Serkan Atasay	Turkey	ıstanbul Yuzme ıhtısas Spor Kulubu	11 March 1970	54 years, 335 days	9 February 2025	Turkish Masters Championships	Edirne, Turkey
60-64	30.40	Thomas Dockhorn	Germany				2 June 2024		
65-69	30.95	Hugh Wilder	United States			65	7 July 2012	USMS Summer Nationals	Omaha, Nebraska
70-74	33.59	Richard Burns	United States			70	11 August 2013	USA Masters Championships	Mission Viejo, California
75-79									
80-84									
85-89									
90-94									
95-99									
100-104									
Men's 100m backstroke
25-29	55.09	Ryota Maejima (JPN)		21 November 2021					
30-34	55.93	Darian Townsend	United States		21 January 1989	29 years, 319 days	13 July 2014		
35-39	56.59	Charles Hockin	Paraguay		4 November 1989	34 years, 116 days	28 February 2024		
40-44	58.38	Enrico Catalano	Italy				3 February 2024		
45-49	59.57	Chuck Barnes	United States				4 August 2023		
50-54	1:01.57	Nicolas Granger	United States				6 August 2017		
55-59	1:03.50	Steve Wood	United States				21 June 2015		
60-64	1:06.08	Jamie Fowler	United States				11 August 2019		
65-69	1:08.15	Vladimir Gorkov	Russia				22 April 2022		
70-74	1:16.40	Richard Burns	United States			70	13 July 2013	Pacific Masters Championships	San Mateo, California
75-79									
80-84									
85-89									
90-94									
95-99									
100-104									
Men's 200m backstroke
25-29	2:02.76	Dmitrii Gorbunov (RUS)		26 April 2019					
30-34	2:02.75	Rogério Romero	Brazil		22 November 1969	31 years, 2 days	24 November 2000		
35-39	2:01.32	Junichi Morita	Japan				7 May 2024		
40-44	2:08.06	Nicholas Neckles	Barbados		24 November 1978	40 years, 262 days	13 August 2019		
45-49	2:11.56	Eduardo Marocco	Brazil			45	7 June 2013	Pan American Masters Championships	Sarasota, Florida
50-54	2:14.53	Nicolas Granger	United States				5 August 2017		
55-59	2:20.38	Frank Gruner	Germany	SCW Eschborn			15 March 2025	German Masters Championships	Wolfsburg, Germany
60-64	2:26.12	Jamie Fowler	United States				8 August 2019		
65-69	2:31.62	Vladimir Gorkov	Russia				23 April 2022		
70-74	2:44.59	Richard Burns	United States			70	9 August 2013	USA Masters Championships	Mission Viejo, California
75-79									
80-84	3:16.22	Bumpy Jones	United States		23 March 1933	80 years, 76 days	7 June 2013	Pan American Masters Championships	Sarasota, Florida
85-89									
90-94									
95-99	5:24.20	Bela Banki Horvath	Hungary	Murena Szegedy Uszo			11 August 2015	World Championships	Kazan, Russia
100-104									

==== Breaststroke ====
Age group	Record		Athlete	Club	Date	Age	Meet	Place	Ref	
Men's 50m breaststroke
25-29	27.21		Kirill Strelnikov (RUS)		18 April 2021	28 years, 324 days				
30-34	27.67		Shotaro Shimazaki	Japan				5 July 2024		
35-39	27.83		Ryouta Nomura	Japan				11 August 2023		
40-44	28.57		Barry Murphy	Ireland	Guinness SC	5 October 1985	39 years, 154 days	8 March 2025	Irish Masters Championships	Limerick, Ireland
45-49	29.22		Hideaki Togo	Japan				9 August 2019		
50-54	29.23		Jeff Commings	United States				23 August 2024		
55-59	30.02		C. Arturo Travaini	Italy				2 June 2019		
60-64	30.57		C. Arturo Travaini	Italy				30 June 2023		
65-69	33.30		Rick Colella	United States		14 December 1951	64 years, 249 days	19 August 2016		
70-74	36.86		Dieter Hoefel	Germany	Sk Sparta Konstanz			13 August 2015	World Championships	Kazan, Russia
75-79	39.22		Antonio Orselli	Brazil	Brasil Masters		75	20 August 2017	World Masters Championships	Budapest
80-84										
85-89										
90-94										
95-99										
100-104										
Men's 100m breaststroke
25-29	1:00.39		Kirill Strelnikov (RUS)		16 April 2021	28 years, 322 days				
30-34	1:00.83		Shotaro Shimazaki	Japan				6 July 2024		
35-39	1:01.99		Ryo Kobayashi	Japan				6 July 2024		
40-44	1:03.60		Vladislav Bragin	Russia				20 May 2012		
45-49	1:04.77		Steve West	United States				14 July 2019		
50-54	1:06.12		Steve West	United States				10 July 2022		
55-59	1:07.65		C. Arturo Travaini	Italy				13 August 2019		
60-64	1:09.57		C. Arturo Travaini	Italy				6 August 2023		
65-69	1:14.77		Rick Colella	United States		14 December 1951	65 years, 234 days	5 August 2017		
70-74	1:23.65		Kenneth Frost	United States			70	4 August 2014	FINA World Masters Championships	Montreal
75-79										
80-84	1:34.43		Bela Fabian	Hungary	Egri Szenior Uszo-Klub		80	15 August 2017	World Masters Championships	Budapest
85-89										
90-94										
95-99										
100-104										
Men's 200m breaststroke
25-29	2:11.78		Clark Burckle (USA)		10 August 2013	25 years, 168 days	USA Masters Championships	Mission Viejo, California		
30-34	2:16.79		Shotaro Shimazaki	Japan				10 August 2023		
35-39	2:20.11		Ryo Kobayashi	Japan				15 September 2024		
40-44	2:18.57		Steve West	United States			43	11 July 2015	Los Angeles Invitational	Los Angeles
45-49	2:19.44	h	Steve West	United States	Irvine Novaquatics		46	22 June 2018	Fran Crippen Memorial Swim Meet	Mission Viejo, California
50-54	2:24.44		Steve West	United States				9 July 2022		
55-59	2:30.63		David Guthrie	United States			56	21 August 2016		
60-64	2:33.57		C. Arturo Travaini	Italy				29 June 2023		
65-69	2:41.54		Rick Colella	United States		14 December 1951	64 years, 251 days	21 August 2016		
70-74										
75-79										
80-84										
85-89										
90-94	5:12.25		Thomas Maine	United States			90	21 June 2015	Spring Chicken Classic	Nashville
95-99										
100-104										

==== Butterfly ====
Age group	Record	Athlete	Club	Date	Age	Meet	Place	Ref	
Men's 50m butterfly
25-29	23.15	Mikhail Vekovishchev (RUS)		10 August 2025	27 years, 5 days				
30-34	23.16	Oleg Kostin	Russia		6 May 1992	31 years, 20 days	26 May 2023		
35-39	24.03	Stefano Razeto	Germany	ST Erzgebirge	1986	38	31 May 2024	German Masters Championships	Stuttgart, Germany
40-44	23.72	Nicholas Santos	Brazil		14 February 1980	44 years, 193 days	25 August 2024		
45-49	24.96	Marc Kevin Allan	South Africa				3 March 2024		
45-49	23.26	Nicholas Santos	Brazil		14 February 1980	45 years, 79 days	4 May 2025	Brazilian Masters Championships	Porto Alegre, Brazil
50-54	25.53	Serkan Atasay	Turkey		11 March 1970	54 years, 68 days	18 May 2024		
55-59	26.08	Serkan Atasay	Turkey		11 March 1970	54 years, 333 days	7 February 2025		
60-64	27.57	David Emerson	Great Britain				4 June 2023		
65-69	28.26	Dan Thompson	Canada		15 June 1956	67 years, 53 days	7 August 2023		
70-74	31.28	Josep Claret	United States			70	17 August 2014	U.S. Masters Championships	College Park, Maryland
75-79	32.76	Hiroshi Matsumoto	Japan						
80-84	38.75	Clarke Mitchell	United States				8 June 2013	Pan American Masters Championships	Sarasota, Florida
85-89									
90-94									
95-99									
100-104									
Men's 100m butterfly
25-29	52.20	Mikhail Vekovishchev (RUS)		11 August 2025	27 years, 6 days				
30-34	53.10	Henrique Martins	Brazil		14 November 1991	30 years, 145 days	8 April 2022		
35-39	53.65	Kohai Kawamoto	United States	Phoenix Swim Club		39	2 August 2018		
40-44	55.29	Carlos Nascimento	Brazil				20 May 2023		
45-49	56.75	Marc Kevin Allan	South Africa				29 February 2024		
50-54	56.99	Eiji Nomura	Japan				8 August 2023		
55-59	59.65	Serkan Atasay	Turkey		11 March 1970	54 years, 335 days	9 February 2025		
60-64	1:02.00	Hugo Bregman	Netherlands				6 May 2018	Open Dutch Masters Championships	The Hague, Netherlands
65-69	1:05.82	Hugo Bregman	Netherlands				5 May 2023		
70-74	1:14.20								
75-79									
80-84									
85-89		Thomas Maine	United States						
90-94	2:23.56	Thomas Maine	United States			90	June 2015		St. Louis, Missouri
95-99									
100-104									
Men's 200m butterfly
25-29	2:00.02	Thomas Beeley (GBR)		28 March 2026					
30-34	2:03.43	Oga Takatsugu	Japan				17 August 2019		
35-39	2:02.54	Nikolay Skvortsov	Russia		28 March 1984	35 years, 29 days	26 April 2019		
40-44	2:05.55	Dennis Baker	United States				11 July 2004		
45-49	2:06.94	Dennis Baker	United States				9 August 2006		
50-54	2:13.26	Eiji Nomura	Japan				6 November 2022		
55-59	2:16.78	Marcus Mattioli	Brazil	Minas Tenis	18 October 1960	54 years, 301 days	15 August 2015	World Championships	Kazan, Russia
60-64	2:23.52	Hugo Bregman	Netherlands				5 May 2018	Open Dutch Masters Championships	The Hague, Netherlands
65-69	2:32.00	Hugo Bregman	Netherlands				7 May 2023		
70-74									
75-79	3:26.21	David McLachlan	South Africa				15 June 2012	FINA World Masters Championships	Riccione, Italy
80-84									
85-89		Thomas Maine	United States						
90-94	5:19.18	Thomas Maine	United States			90	June 2015		St. Louis, Missouri
95-99									
100-104									

==== Individual medley ====
Age group	Record	Athlete	Club	Date	Age	Meet	Place	Ref	
Men's 200m individual medley
25-29	2:03.62	Dmitrii Gorbunov (RUS)		28 April 2019					
30-34	2:02.18	Darian Townsend	United States		28 August 1984	31 years, 268 days	22 May 2016		
35-39	2:05.65	Darian Townsend	United States		28 August 1984	34 years, 313 days	7 July 2019		
40-44	2:08.63	Markus Rogan	United States		4 May 1982	41 years, 23 days	27 May 2023		
45-49	2:10.09	Nicolas Granger	France			49	7 August 2016		
50-54	2:11.15	Nicolas Granger	United States				6 August 2017		
55-59	2:20.67	Jerome Frentsos	United States				22 February 2020		
60-64	2:21.99	Rick Colella	United States		14 December 1951	62 years, 246 days	17 August 2014	U.S. Masters Championships	College Park, United States
65-69	2:25.22	Rick Colella	United States		14 December 1951	64 years, 249 days	19 August 2016		
70-74									
75-79									
80-84	3:26.78	Bela Fabian	Hungary	Egri Szenior Uszo-Klub		80	17 August 2017	World Masters Championships	Budapest
85-89		Thomas Maine	United States						
90-94	4:35.62	Thomas Maine	United States			90	20 June 2015	Spring Chicken Classic	Nashville, Tennessee
95-99									
100-104									
Men's 400m individual medley
25-29	4:30.05	Diogo De Oliveira Yabe (BRA)		12 September 2009					
30-34	4:20.81	Darian Townsend	United States		28 August 1984	31 years, 330 days	23 July 2016		
35-39	4:36.66	Ioannis Drymonakos	Greece	Athlitikos Omilos Okeanos	18 January 1984	35 years, 208 days	14 August 2019	World Championships	Gwangju, South Korea
40-44	4:42.54	Ioannis Drymonakos	Greece		18 January 1984	40 years, 45 days	3 March 2024		
45-49	4:43.83	Nicolas Granger	France				6 August 2014	FINA World Masters Championships	Montreal
50-54	4:45.61	Nicolas Granger	United States				3 August 2017		
55-59	4:57.55	Brent Foster	New Zealand		23 May 1967	54 years, 314 days	2 April 2022		
60-64	5:08.20	Rick Colella	United States		14 December 1951	62 years, 244 days	15 August 2014	U.S. Masters Championships	College Park, United States
65-69	5:13.36	Rick Colella	United States		14 December 1951	65 years, 232 days	3 August 2017		
70-74									
75-79									
80-84									
85-89		Thomas Maine	United States						
90-94	9:56.43	Thomas Maine	United States			90	6 June 2015		St. Louis, Missouri
95-99									
100-104									

==== Relay ====
Age group	Record	Athlete	Nationality	Club	Birthdate	Age	Date	Meet	Place	Ref
Men's 4×50m freestyle
100-119										
120-159	1:34.09	Maksim Kruk; Ilya Kavalionak; Pavel Lagoun; Pavel Zinkevich	Belarus	Zubr	12 February 1979	36 years, 183 days	14 August 2015	World Championships	Kazan, Russia	
160-199	1:34.92	Aleksandr Shilin (24.36); Sergei Medvedev (23.75); Aleksei Manzhula (22.79); Vladimir Predkin (24.02)	Russia	Neva Stars	31 May 1969	41 years, 197 days 35; 37; 48 years, 79 days	18 August 2017	World Masters Championships	Budapest	
200-239										
240-279										
280-319	1:56.91	David Quiggin (28.64); David Painter (31.16); Keefe Lodwig (29.91); Lee Childs (27.20)	United States	Gold Coast Masters		70; 76; 71; 66	15 August 2014	U.S. Masters Championships	College Park, Maryland	
320-359										
360-399										
Men's 4 × 100 m freestyle
100-119										
120-159										
160-199	3:38.60	Tyler Blessing (55.36); Mike Varozza (54.79); Andre Rasmussen (56.08); Chris Eckerman (52.37)	United States	Longhorn Aquatics Masters			3 July 2011	Texas Open	Austin, Texas	
200-239	3:57.73	Al Jaegers; Jeffrey Utsch; Barry Roth; Scott Shake	United States	Tucson Ford Aquatics			10 June 2011	Southwest Classic	Tucson, Arizona	
240-279	4:04.77	Hubie Kerns (1:07.07); Glenn Gruber (1:03.13); Michael Blatt (59.93); Mike Shaffer (57.74)	United States	Ventura County Masters			16 August 2015	Southern Pacific Masters Swimming Zone Championships	Mission Viejo, California	
280-319										
320-359										
360-399										
Men's 4 × 200 m freestyle
100-119	8:26.92									
120-159										
160-199	8:23.72	Terry DeBiase (2:06.45); Patrick Brundage (2:07.27); Kurt Dickson (2:06.03); Jeff Utsch (2:03.97)	United States	Tucson Ford Dealers Aquatics			7 June 2014	Southwest Classic	Tucson, Arizona	
200-239	8:51.74	Al Jaegers; Jeffrey Utsch; Scott Shake; Jeff Krongaard	United States	Tucson Ford Aquatics			11 June 2011	Southwest Classic	Tucson, Arizona	
240-279	9:11.24	Jim McConica (2:23.35); Glenn Gruber (2:21.22); Michael Blatt (2:17.81); Mike Shaffer (2:08.56)	United States	Ventura County Masters	19 December 1950	64 years, 239 days	15 August 2015	Southern Pacific Masters Swimming Zone Championships	Mission Viejo, California	
280-319										
320-359										
360-399										
Men's 4×50m medley
100-119	1:43.83	Alexey Gulakov; Igor Golovin; Andrey Denisko; Ivan Kovalev	Russia	Troyka			14 August 2015	World Championships	Kazan, Russia	
120-159										
160-199	1:45.47	Aleksandr Shilin (27.27); Sergey Gogol (29.46); Aleksei Manzhula (24.92); Vladimir Predkin (23.82)	Russia	Neva Stars A	2 February 1976 31 May 1969	41 years, 197 days 36; 37; 48 years, 79 days	18 August 2017	World Masters Championships	Budapest	
200-239										
240-279	2:01.60	Jonathan Klein (31.25); Neal Vestal (33.48); Donald Gilchrist (30.61); Paul Trevisan (26.26)	United States	North Carolina Masters		57; 60; 60; 63	17 August 2014	U.S. Masters Championships	College Park, Maryland	
280-319	2:16.15	Jose Loro (34.05); Antonio Orselli (38.94); Paulo Motta (32.14); Jose Guisard Ferraz (31.02)	Brazil	Brazil Master SC		68; 75; 69; 72	18 August 2017	World Masters Championships	Budapest	
320-359										
360-399										
Men's 4 × 100 m medley
100-119	3:37.49	Chris A Clark; Daniel Michael; Grant Wieczorek; Ben Christoffel	United States	YMCA Indy Swimfit			8 August 2009	USMS Summer Nationals	Indianapolis, Indiana	
120-159										
160-199	4:11.57	Chris Eckerman (1:01.53); Todd Bartee (1:14.45); Tyler Blessing (59.09); Mike Varozza (55.92)	United States	Longhorn Aquatics Masters			2 July 2011	Texas Open	Austin, Texas	
200-239	4:34.41	Steve Mortimer; Bill Brenner; Brian Saylor; Jack Groselle	United States	Sarasota Y Sharks Masters			11 June 2011	Bumpy Jones Classic	Sarasota, Florida	
240-279	4:44.34	Steve Newman (1:11.56); Bill Brenner (1:20.08); Jack Groselle (1:06.98); Rick Walker (1:05.72)	United States	Sarasota Y Sharks Masters			15 June 2016	Bumpy Jones Classic	Sarasota, Florida	
280-319										
320-359	7:56.60	Pierre Hathaway; August Motmans; Ashley Jones; Harry Goldsmith	United States	Alameda Aquatics Masters			10 July 2011	Pacific Championships	Santa Cruz, California	
360-399										

Legend: # – Record awaiting ratification by FINA; e – equalled existing record;
Records not set in finals: h – heat; sf – semifinal; r – relay 1st leg; rh – relay heat 1st leg; b – B final; † – en route to final mark; so – swim-off; tt – time trial

=== Women ===
Key: Awaiting ratification

==== Freestyle ====
Age group	Record		Athlete	Club	Date	Age	Meet	Place	Ref	
Women's 50m freestyle
25-29	25.37		Missy Cundiff (USA)		24 August 2024					
30-34	25.33		Rebecca Guy (GBR)		14 June 2025					
35-39										
40-44	26.44		Edith Ottermann	United States						
45-49										
50-54	27.79		Anette Philipsson	Sweden	Linkopings Allmanna SS			13 August 2015	World Masters Championships	Kazan, Russia
55-59	28.69		Laura Val	United States	Tamalpais Aquatic Masters			17 August 2008		
60-64	29.31		Laura Val	United States	Tamalpais Aquatic Masters			6 August 2011	USMS Nationals	Auburn, Alabama
65-69	31.28		Sanderina Kruger	South Africa	Cape Town MSC			13 August 2015	World Masters Championships	Kazan, Russia
70-74										
75-79	34.11		Diann Uustal	United States				8 October 2021		
80-84	38.60		Jane Asher	Great Britain		20 March 1931	81 years, 146 days	13 August 2012	World Masters Championships	Riccione, Italy
85-89										
90-94	52.09		Jean Troy	United States	Sarasota Y Sharks Masters			11 August 2017	Bumpy Jones Classic	Sarasota, Florida
95-99										
100-104										
Women's 100m freestyle
25-29	56.96		Emma Gage (GBR)	Trafford Metro Bor SC	11 August 2015		World Masters Championships	Kazan, Russia		
30-34	55.24		Erika Erndl (USA)		11 July 2009					
35-39										
40-44	58.04	†	Erica Braun	United States				8 June 2013	Pan American Masters Championships	Sarasota, Florida
45-49										
50-54	1:01.13		Laura Val	United States	Tamalpais Aquatic Masters			2001		
55-59	1:02.02		Laura Val	United States	Tamalpais Aquatic Masters			16 August 2008		
60-64	1:03.83		Laura Val	United States	Tamalpais Aquatic Masters			5 August 2011	USMS Nationals	Auburn, Alabama
65-69	1:05.00		Laura Val	United States	Tamalpais Aquatic Masters		66	15 August 2017	World Masters Championships	Budapest
70-74										
75-79	1:19.71		Yoshiko Osaki	Japan				2014		
80-84										
85-89			Jean Troy	United States						
90-94	1:46.18		Jane Asher	Great Britain	King’s Cormorants	20 March 1931	91 years, 90 days	18 June 2022	British Masters Championships	Aberdeen, Great Britain
95-99	2:25.20		Rita Simonton	United States			95	11 August 2013	USA Masters Championships	Mission Viejo, California
100-104										
Women's 200m freestyle
25-29	2:02.06		Jenna Campbell (USA)		22 August 2024					
30-34	2:02.35		Natthanan Junkrajang (THA)		14 August 2019	33 years, 123 days				
35-39										
40-44										
45-49										
50-54	2:13.18		Jill Hernandez	United States			53	8 August 2013	USA Masters Championships	Mission Viejo, California
55-59	2:16.28		Laura Val	United States	Tamalpais Aquatic Masters			6 August 2009		
60-64	2:21.48		Laura Val	United States	Tamalpais Aquatic Masters			12 August 2012	World Masters Championships	Riccione, Italy
65-69	2:37.63		Sanderina Kruger	South Africa	Cape Town MSC			12 August 2015	World Masters Championships	Kazan, Russia
70-74										
75-79										
80-84										
85-89	3:49.67		Jean Troy	United States				14 July 2012		
90-94	3:52.96		Jane Asher	Great Britain	King’s Cormorants	20 March 1931	91 years, 91 days	19 June 2022	British Masters Championships	Aberdeen, Great Britain
95-99	5:04.08		Rita Simonton	United States			95	8 August 2013	USA Masters Championships	Mission Viejo, United States
100-104										
Women's 400m freestyle
25-29	4:15.99		Lea Boy (GER)	SV Würzburg 05	5 July 2025	25 years, 162 days	Süddeutsche Meisterschaften	Würzburg, Germany		
30-34	4:18.63		Dawn Heckman (USA)		16 July 2011					
35-39										
40-44	4:22.87		Janet Evans	United States		28 August 1971	39 years, 351 days	14 August 2011	Southern Pacific Masters Association's Championships	Mission Viejo, California
45-49										
50-54	4:40.66		Jill Hernandez	United States			53	11 August 2013	USA Masters Championships	Mission Viejo, California
55-59	4:50.13		Laura Val	United States	Tamalpais Aquatic Masters			12 July 2009		
60-64	4:59.82		Laura Val	United States	Tamalpais Aquatic Masters			11 August 2012	Pacific Masters Championships	San Mateo, California
65-69										
70-74										
75-79										
80-84	6:40.11		Jane Asher	Great Britain				16 June 2012	World Masters Championships	Riccione, Italy
85-89			Jean Troy	United States						
90-94										
95-99										
100-104	16:36.80		Mieko Nagaoka	Japan			100	19 January 2014		
100-104	12:50.3		Betty Brussel	Canada	White Rock Wave Swim Club	28 July 1924	99 years, 177 days	21 January 2024	Victoria Masters Swim Club Meet	Saanich, Canada
Women's 800m freestyle
25-29	8:45.89		Swann Oberson (SUI)		10 March 2012	25 years, 228 days				
30-34	8:46.47		Dawn Heckman (USA)		14 July 2011					
35-39										
40-44	8:59.06		Janet Evans	United States		28 August 1971	39 years, 287 days	11 June 2011	Janet Evans Invitational	Fullerton, California
45-49										
50-54										
55-59	10:05.28		Laura Val	United States	Tamalpais Aquatic Masters			12 July 2008		
60-64	10:27.71	†	Laura Val	United States	Tamalpais Aquatic Masters			8 July 2011	Pacific Championships	Santa Cruz, California
65-69										
70-74										
75-79										
80-84										
85-89	16:45.59		Dorothy Dickey	Australia	Doncaster Dolphins			10 August 2015	World Championships	Kazan, Russia
90-94										
95-99	21:39.10		Maurine Kornfeld	United States	Rose Bowl Masters		96	14 August 2017	World Masters Championships	Budapest
100-104										
Women's 1500m freestyle
25-29	16:34.89		Swann Oberson (SUI)		11 March 2012	25 years, 229 days				
30-34	17:20.55		Sophie Casson (GBR)		16 June 2017					
35-39	17:28.51		Heidi George	United States			38	13 August 2014	U.S. Masters Championships	College Park, Maryland
40-44										
45-49										
50-54										
55-59	19:14.70		Laura Val	United States	Tamalpais Aquatic Masters			8 July 2007		
60-64	19:52.85	†	Laura Val	United States	Tamalpais Aquatic Masters			8 July 2011	Pacific Championships	Santa Cruz, California
65-69										
70-74										
75-79										
80-84										
85-89										
90-94										
95-99										
100-104										

==== Backstroke ====
Age group	Record		Athlete	Club	Date	Age	Meet	Place	Ref
50 metres backstroke
25-29	28.39		Emi Moronuki (USA)		2 August 2018	25 years, 284 days			
30-34	28.79		Noriko Inada (JPN)	Phoenix Masters	5 August 2011	33 years, 9 days	USMS Nationals	Auburn, Alabama	
35-39									
40-44	30.47		Raakel Luoto (FIN)	Abo Simklubb-Uintiklubi Turku	20 August 2017	42	World Masters Championships	Budapest	
45-49	31.71	=	Jenkins (USA)						
45-49	31.71	=	Ellen Reynolds (USA)		7 July 2012	48	USMS Summer Nationals	Omaha, Nebraska	
50-54	32.43		Leslie Livingston (USA)		7 July 2012	51	USMS Summer Nationals	Omaha, Nebraska	
55-59	33.75		Laura Val (USA)	Tamalpais Aquatic Masters	12 July 2010				
60-64	34.30		Laura Val (USA)	Tamalpais Aquatic Masters	7 July 2012	61	USMS Summer Nationals	Omaha, Nebraska	
65-69	34.46		Laura Val (USA)	Tamalpais Aquatic Masters	20 August 2017	66	World Masters Championships	Budapest	
70-74	40.67		Satoko Takeuji (JPN)		16 June 2012		FINA World Masters Championships	Riccione, Italy	
75-79									
80-84									
85-89	51.81		Betty Lorenzi (USA)		7 July 2012	85	USMS Summer Nationals	Omaha, Nebraska	
90-94									
95-99	1:15.69		Rita Simonton (USA)		11 August 2013	95	USA Masters Championships	Mission Viejo, California	
100-104	1:29.84		Maurine Kornfeld (USA)		1 August 2021	100			
100-104	1:24.91		Betty Brussel (CAN)	White Rock Wave Swim Club	20 January 2024	99 years, 176 days	Victoria Masters Swim Club Meet	Saanich, Canada	
100 metres backstroke
25-29	1:01.60		Emi Moronuki (USA)		31 July 2018	25 years, 282 days			
30-34	1:01.78		Noriko Inada (JPN)	Phoenix Masters	5 August 2011	33 years, 9 days	USMS Nationals	Auburn, Alabama	
35-39	1:01.75		Noriko Inada (JPN)	Phoenix Swim Club	19 August 2017	39 years, 23 days	World Masters Championships	Budapest	
40-44	1:06.32		Raakel Luoto (FIN)	Abo Simklubb-Uintiklubi Turku	19 August 2017	42	World Masters Championships	Budapest	
45-49									
50-54	1:11.78		Karlyn Pipes (USA)	Unattached	11 August 2012	50 years, 146 days	Pacific Masters Championships	San Mateo, California	
55-59	1:14.41		Laura Val (USA)	Tamalpais Aquatic Masters	17 August 2008				
60-64	1:15.92		Laura Val (USA)		8 August 2013		USA Masters Championships	Mission Viejo, California	
65-69	1:15.66		Laura Val (USA)	Tamalpais Aquatic Masters	19 August 2017	66	World Masters Championships	Budapest	
70-74	1:26.15		Satoko Takeuji (JPN)		15 June 2012		World Masters Championships	Riccione, Italy	
75-79									
80-84									
85-89	1:54.22		Betty Lorenzi (USA)		8 July 2012	85	USMS Summer Nationals	Omaha, Nebraska	
90-94									
95-99	2:42.67		Rita Simonton (USA)		8 August 2013		USA Masters Championships	Mission Viejo, California	
100-104									
200 metres backstroke
25-29	2:13.19		Emi Moronuki (USA)		30 July 2018	25 years, 281 days			
30-34									
35-39	2:18.20		Karlyn Pipes (USA)		10 August 1997	35 years, 145 days			
40-44									
45-49									
50-54	2:26.14		Joanna Corben (GBR)		19 April 2024		British Masters Championships	Swansea, Great Britain	
55-59			Nancy Steadman Martin (USA)						
60-64	2:44.38		Laura Val (USA)	Tamalpais Aquatic Masters	13 July 2013	62	Pacific Masters Championships	San Mateo, California	
65-69									
70-74									
75-79	3:28.42		Christel Schulz (GER)	Einheit Rathenow	April 2015				
80-84									
85-89	4:11.77		Betty Lorenzi (USA)		6 July 2012	85	USMS Summer Nationals	Omaha, Nebraska	
90-94									
95-99									
100-104									

==== Breaststroke ====
Age group	Record	Athlete	Club	Age	Date	Meet	Place	Ref
Women's 50m breaststroke
25-29	31.60	Megan Jendrick (USA)	Pacific Northwest Aquatics	26 years, 176 days	10 July 2010			
30-34	32.32	Nicole Heidemann (GER)			2013			
35-39	32.67	Nicole Heidemann (GER)	TV Meppen	35	20 August 2017	World Masters Championships	Budapest	
40-44	33.09	Linley Frame (AUS)		55 years, 9 days				
45-49	33.56	Linley Frame (AUS)	Melbourne Vicentre	45 years, 281 days	20 August 2017	World Masters Championships	Budapest	
50-54	34.18	Monica Coro (ITA)			13 June 2012	FINA World Masters Championships	Riccione, Italy	
55-59	36.59	Pia Thulstrup (DEN)	Swim Team Taastrup	56	20 August 2017	World Masters Championships	Budapest	
60-64								
65-69	40.51	Giurgiza Gabrilo (CRO)			13 June 2012	FINA World Masters Championships	Riccione, Italy	
70-74								
75-79								
80-84	49.49	Agnes van Obberghen (BEL)			13 June 2012	FINA World Masters Championships	Riccione, Italy	
85-89								
90-94	1:14.04	Jean Troy (USA)	Sarasota Y Sharks Masters		11 June 2017	Bumpy Jones Classic	Sarasota, Florida	
95-99								
100-104
100-104	1:56.22	Betty Brussel (CAN)	White Rock Wave Swim Club	99 years, 176 days	20 January 2024	Victoria Masters Swim Club Meet	Saanich, Canada	
Women's 100m breaststroke
25-29	1:10.56	Megan Jendrick (USA)	Pacific Northwest Aquatics	26 years, 176 days	10 June 2010			
30-34								
35-39	1:12.34	Katie Glenn (USA)		37	8 June 2013	USA Masters Championships	Mission Viejo, California	
40-44								
45-49								
50-54	1:15.44	Helen Gorman (GBR)	City of Cardiff	49 years, 189 days	4 June 2022	Yorkshire Masters	Sheffield, United Kingdom	
55-59	1:23.16	Jenny Whiteley (AUS)			3 June 2013	Australian Masters Championships	Sydney, Australia	
60-64								
65-69	1:30.16	Giurgiza Gabrilo (CRO)			11 June 2012	FINA World Masters Championships	Riccione, Italy	
70-74								
75-79								
80-84	1:57.17	Ann Hirsch (USA)	Walnut Creek Masters		5 August 2011	USMS Nationals	Auburn, Alabama	
85-89								
90-94	2:43.03	Jean Troy (USA)	Sarasota Y Sharks Masters		10 June 2017	Bumpy Jones Classic	Sarasota, Florida	
95-99								
100-104								
Women's 200m breaststroke
25-29	2:32.35	Irina Shvaeva (RUS)			24 June 2023			
30-34								
35-39								
40-44								
45-49								
50-54	2:44.66	Helen Gorman (GBR)	City of Cardiff	49 years, 202 days	17 June 2022	British Masters Championships	Aberdeen, Great Britain	
55-59	3:02.67	Jenny Whiteley (AUS)			4 May 2013	Australian Masters Championships	Sydney, Australia	
60-64								
65-69	3:12.63	Amanda Heath (GBR)	Spencer		17 June 2022	British Masters Championships	Aberdeen, United Kingdom	
70-74								
75-79								
80-84	4:17.64	Ann Hirsch (USA)	Walnut Creek Masters		10 July 2011	Pacific Championships	Santa Cruz, California	
85-89								
90-94								
95-99								
100-104								

==== Butterfly ====
Age group	Record	Athlete	Club	Age	Date	Meet	Place	Ref	
Women's 50m butterfly
25-29	26.32	Masako Kuroki (JPN)		25 years, 177 days	16 June 2019		Tokyo, Japan		
30-34	27.48	Martina Moravcova	Slovakia		2008				
35-39	27.46	Noriko Inada	Japan		27 July 1978	36 years, 10 days	6 August 2014	FINA World Masters Championships	Montreal
40-44	28.36	Erica Braun	United States				8 June 2013	Pan American Masters Championships	Sarasota, Florida
45-49	29.11								
50-54	29.82	Susan O Williams	United States		10 March 1966	50 years, 136 days	24 July 2016	Summer Meet No.1	Baltimore, Maryland
55-59	30.97	Traci Granger	United States				9 August 2013	USA Masters Championships	Mission Viejo, California
60-64	32.81	Laura Val	United States	Tamalpais Aquatic Masters			5 August 2011	USMS Nationals	Auburn, Alabama
65-69	34.56	Diann Uustal	United States	Maine Masters		67	8 June 2013	Pan American Masters Championships	Sarasota, Florida
70-74	35.56	Diann Uustal	United States	New England Masters			10 June 2017	Bumpy Jones Classic	Sarasota, Florida
75-79	40.06	Christel Schulz	Germany				March 2015		
80-84									
85-89									
90-94									
95-99									
100-104									
Women's 100m butterfly
25-29	59.99	Anna Poliakova (RUS)	Neva Stars	28 years, 304 days	13 August 2015	World Championships	Kazan, Russia		
30-34									
35-39									
40-44									
45-49									
50-54	1:04.96	Wenke Seider	United States				7 August 2014	FINA World Masters Championships	Montreal
55-59	1:09.47	Laura Val	United States	Tamalpais Aquatic Masters			9 August 2009		
60-64	1:12.06	Laura Val	United States	Tamalpais Aquatic Masters			4 August 2011	USMS Nationals	Auburn, Alabama
65-69	1:26.13	Brigitte Merten	Germany						
70-74	1:24.55	Judy Wilson	Great Britain		27 July 1978	36 years, 10 days	7 August 2014	FINA World Masters Championships	Montreal
75-79									
80-84									
85-89									
90-94									
95-99									
100-104									
Women's 200m butterfly
25-29	2:15.02	Hannah Saiz (USA)			20 May 2017	WI SSTY Distance-Sprint Meet	Brown Deer, United States		
30-34									
35-39									
40-44									
45-49									
50-54									
55-59	2:41.51	Laura Val	United States	Tamalpais Aquatic Masters			8 August 2007		
60-64	2:41.03	Laura Val	United States	Tamalpais Aquatic Masters			6 August 2011	USMS Nationals	Auburn, Alabama
65-69									
70-74									
75-79									
80-84									
85-89									
90-94									
95-99									
100-104									

==== Individual medley ====
Age group	Record	Athlete	Club	Date	Age	Meet	Place	Ref	
Women's 200m individual medley
25-29	2:19.54	Maaike Ramael (BEL)		11 August 2025	25 years, 177 days				
30-34									
35-39									
40-44									
45-49									
50-54	2:31.81	Ellen Reynolds	United States				7 August 2014	FINA World Masters Championships	Montreal
55-59	2:43.45	Laura Val	United States	Tamalpais Aquatic Masters			16 August 2008		
60-64	2:47.99	Laura Val	United States	Tamalpais Aquatic Masters		62	14 July 2013	Pacific Masters Championships	San Mateo, California
65-69									
70-74									
75-79	3:32.94	Yoshiko Osaki	Japan				2013		
80-84	3:53.63	Kati Dr Flora	Hungary	Debreceni Szenior Uszo Klub		83	17 August 2017	World Masters Championships	Budapest
85-89	5:05.64	Jean Troy	United States			86	11 August 2013	Pan American Masters Championships	Sarasota, Florida
90-94									
95-99									
100-104									
Women's 400m individual medley
25-29	5:02.78	Hitomi Matsuda (JPN)		5 November 2006					
30-34									
35-39									
40-44									
45-49									
50-54	5:20.68	Ellen Reynolds	United States				6 August 2014	FINA World Masters Championships	Montreal
55-59	5:49.40	Laura Val	United States	Tamalpais Aquatic Masters			10 August 2009		
60-64	5:56.27	Laura Val	United States	Tamalpais Aquatic Masters			8 July 2011	Pacific Championships	Santa Cruz, California
65-69									
70-74									
75-79									
80-84									
85-89		Jean Troy	United States						
90-94									
95-99									
100-104									

==== Relay ====
Age group	Record	Athlete	Nationality	Club	Birthdate	Age	Date	Meet	Place	Ref
Women's 4×50m freestyle
100-119	1:50.30	Evgenia Karetina; Ekaterina Shershen; Anna Kuzmicheva; Anna Polyakova	Russia	Neva Stars			14 August 2015	World Championships	Kazan, Russia	
120-159	1:49.03	Svetlana Knyaginina; Alla Feoktistova; Lyubov Yudina; Irina Shlemova	Russia	Tsunami	13 January 1981 3 March 1984	34 years, 213 days 31 years, 164 days	14 August 2015	World Championships	Kazan, Russia	
160-199	1:48.44			Team TYR			2006			
200-239		Monica Bailey	United States	Lone Star Masters						
240-279	2:06.42	Karen Mareb; Diann Uustal; Tracy Grilli; Jacki Hirsty	Brazil	New England Masters			8 August 2014	FINA World Masters Championships	Montreal	
280-319	2:29.53	Ruth Stubert (35.79); Monika Senftleben (41.56); Angelika Radau (37.66); Brigitte Merten (34.52)	Germany	SG Neukölln Berlin		68; 75; 69; 71	18 August 2017	World Masters Championships	Budapest	
320-359										
360-399										
Women's 4 × 100 m freestyle
100-119										
120-159	4:03.01	Stephanie Cholyk; Ceilidh Osland; Gail McGinnis; Michelle MacWhirter	Canada	Edmonton Masters			19 May 2013	Canadian Masters Championships	Ottawa, Canada	
160-199	4:06.90	Erika Braun (1:01.25); Jen Stringer; Alicia Uhl; Kerry Lindauer	United States	North Carolina Masters		43; 41; 38; 39	13 June 2015	Bumpy Jones Classic	Sarasota, Florida	
200-239	4:20.68		South Africa	Cape Town Masters			March 2013			
240-279	4:47.03	Sanderina Kruger (1:10.45); Judy Brewis; Cecilia Stanford; Dianne Coetzee	South Africa			66	20 March 2015	South African Masters Championships	Johannesburg, South Africa	
280-319										
320-359										
360-399										
Women's 4 × 200 m freestyle
100-119										
120-159										
160-199	9:18.33	Erika Braun (1:01.25); Jen Stringer; Alicia Uhl; Kerry Lindauer	United States	North Carolina Masters		43; 41; 38; 39	14 June 2015	Bumpy Jones Classic	Sarasota, Florida	
200-239	9:37.01	Erika Stebbins (2:16.87); Christie Ciraulo (2:33.67); Veronia Hibben (2:26.75); Laurie Dodd (2:19.72)	United States	UCLA Masters		44; 61; 58; 42	6 July 2014	Patrick Moore Memorial Relay Meet	Mission Viejo, California	
240-279	11:30.92	Maureen Hughes; Pat Sargent; Danielle Ogier; Jeannie Mitchell	United States	Gold Coast Masters			11 June 2011	Bumpy Jones Classic	Sarasota, Florida	
280-319										
320-359										
360-399										
Women's 4×50m medley
100-119	2:00.05	Evgenia Karetina; Anna Kuzmicheva; Anna Polyakova; Ekaterina Shershen	Russia	Neva Stars			14 August 2015	World Championships	Kazan, Russia	
120-159										
160-199	2:04.75			Team TYR			2006			
200-239										
240-279	2:24.95	Beth Estel; Diann Uustal; Laura Delorey; Jacki Hirsty	Brazil	New England Masters			8 August 2014	FINA World Masters Championships	Montreal	
280-319										
320-359										
360-399										
Women's 4 × 100 m medley
100-119										
120-159										
160-199	4:41.71	Erika Braun (1:10.09); Kerry Lindauer; Alicia Uhl; Jen Stringer	United States	North Carolina Masters		43; 41; 38; 39	13 June 2015	Bumpy Jones Classic	Sarasota, Florida	
200-239	5:02.61	Erika Stebbins; Christie Ciraulo; Veronia Hibben; Jenny Cook	United States	UCLA Masters		43; 60; 57	2013			
240-279	5:51.60	Maureen Hughes; Pat Sargent; Danielle Ogier; Jeannie Mitchell	United States	Gold Coast Masters			11 June 2011	Bumpy Jones Classic	Sarasota, Florida	
280-319										
320-359										
360-399										

Legend: # – Record awaiting ratification by FINA; e – equalled existing record;
Records not set in finals: h – heat; sf – semifinal; r – relay 1st leg; rh – relay heat 1st leg; b – B final; † – en route to final mark; so – swim-off; tt – time trial

=== Mixed Relay ===
Age group	Record	Athlete	Nationality	Club	Birthdate	Age	Date	Meet	Place	Ref
Mixed 4×50m freestyle
100-119										
120-159	1:40.14	Alexandr Satanovskiy; Irina Shlemova; Svetlana Knyaginina; Andrey Krylov	Russia	Tsunami	3 March 1984 10 April 1984	31 years, 164 days 31 years, 126 days	14 August 2015	World Masters Championships	Kazan, Russia	
160-199										
200-239										
240-279	1:55.19	Calvin Maughan; Sanderina Kruger; Dianne Coetzee; Tim Shead	South Africa	Cape Town MSC			14 August 2015	World Masters Championships	Kazan, Russia	
280-319	2:05.58	Richard Burns (29.87); Laura Val (29.26); Nancy Ridout (39.18); Tate Holt (27.27)	United States	Tamalpais Aquatic A		74; 66; 75; 66	18 August 2017	World Masters Championships	Budapest	
320-359										
360-399	3:36.78	Frank Piemme; Maurine Kornfeld; Rita Simonton; Jurgen Schmidt	United States	Mission Viejo Nadadores		88; 92; 95; 90	9 August 2013	USA Masters Championships	Mission Viejo, California	
Mixed 4 × 100m freestyle
100-119										
120-159										
160-199										
200-239	4:02.62	David Sims (56.26); Andrea Block; Liz Dillmann; Jim Tuchler (57.67)	United States	Illinois Masters		53; 54; 50; 50	21 June 2015	Masters State Championships	Brown Deer, Wisconsin	
240-279	4:19.89	Calvin Maughan (54.36); Sanderina Kruger (1:10.22); Dianne Coetzee; Tim Shead	South Africa			66	19 March 2015	South African Masters Championships	Johannesburg, South Africa	
280-319										
320-359	6:43.08	Charles Weatherbee; Robert MacDonald; Patricia Tullman; Jean Troy	United States	Florida Maverick Masters			11 June 2011	Bumpy Jones Classic	Sarasota, Florida	
360-399										
Mixed 4 × 200m freestyle
100-119										
120-159	8:41.82	Joy Stover; Christie Peterfish; Tony Rezek; Tony Diers	United States	Missouri Valley Masters		37; 27; 40; 33	9 March 2013		Roeland Park, United States	
160-199										
200-239										
240-279	9:49.76	Stephen Allen; Julie Hoyle; Karen Graham; Nicholas Parkes	Great Britain	Harrogate	27 March 1938	84 years, 83 days	18 June 2022	British Masters Championships	Aberdeen, Great Britain	
280-319	12:51.15		United States	San Diego Masters			14 August 2011	Southern Pacific Masters Association's Championships	Mission Viejo, California	
320-359										
360-399										
Mixed 4×50m medley
100-119										
120-159	1:50.77	Noriko Inada; Jeff Commings; Misty Hyman; Jose Ponce	United States	Phoenix Swim Club	27 July 1978 23 March 1979	40 years 39 years	8 July 2012	USMS Summer Nationals	Omaha, Nebraska	
160-199	1:55.32	Vladimir Predkin; Pavel Lebedev; Anna Polyakova; Olga Pozdnyakova	Russia	Neva Stars	31 May 1969	46 years, 75 days	14 August 2015	World Masters Championships	Kazan, Russia	
200-239	1:59.99	Michelle Ware (31.58); David Bryant (32.22); Mike Hodgson (26.14); Lynda Coggins (30.05)	Great Britain	Guildford City Swimming		44; 56; 50; 53	18 August 2017	World Masters Championships	Budapest	
240-279										
280-319										
320-359										
360-399										
Mixed 4 × 100m medley
100-119										
120-159										
160-199										
200-239	4:33.17	Jim Tuchler (1:05.14); David Sims (1:15.37); Andrea Block (1:11.30); Liz Dillmann (1:01.36)	United States	Illinois Masters		50; 53; 54; 50	21 June 2015	Masters State Championships	Brown Deer, Wisconsin	
240-279										
280-319										
320-359										
360-399										

Legend: # – Record awaiting ratification by FINA; e – equalled existing record;
Records not set in finals: h – heat; sf – semifinal; r – relay 1st leg; rh – relay heat 1st leg; b – B final; † – en route to final mark; so – swim-off; tt – time trial

== Short Course ==
=== Men ===
Key: Awaiting ratification

==== Freestyle ====
Age group	Record		Athlete	Nationality	Club	Birthdate	Age	Date	Meet	Place	Ref
Men's 50m freestyle
25-29	21.28		Ryan Held	United States	Arizona Masters	27 June 1995	26 years, 146 days	20 November 2021	Ron Johnson Invitational	Tempe, Arizona	
30-34	21.98		Nick Brunelli	United States	SwimMAC-Carolina Masters	18 December 1981	29 years, 316 days	30 October 2011	Dixie Zone Championships	Charlotte, North Carolina	
35-39											
40-44											
45-49	23.65		Matt Biondi	United States	Conejo Valley Masters	8 October 1965	47 years, 54 days	1 December 2012	Southern Pacific Championships	Long Beach, California	
50-54											
55-59	24.66		Steve Wood	United States	Central Florida			12 October 2015	Rowdy Gaines Masters Classic	Orlando, Florida	
60-64	24.90		Richard Abrahams	United States							
65-69	25.42	r	Doug Martin	United States	Little Rock Masters		64 years, 295 days	33. March 2018	Albatross Open Masters Meet	North Bethesda, United States	
70-74	26.88		Richard Abrahams	United States	Colorado Masters	20 March 1945	70 years, 206 days	12 October 2015	Rowdy Gaines Masters Classic	Orlando, Florida	
75-79											
80-84	31.25		Jeff Farrell	United States		28 February 1937	80 years, 280 days	5 December 2017		United States	
85-89											
90-94											
95-99											
100-104	1:16.92		Jaring Timmerman	Canada							
105-109	2:52.48		Jaring Timmerman	Canada				24 January 2014	Catherine Kerr Pentathlon	Winnipeg, Canada	
Men's 100m freestyle
25-29	47.43		César Cielo	Brazil		10 January 1987	27 years, 310 days	16 November 2014	Ron Johnson Invitational	Tempe, Arizona	
30-34	48.08		Darian Townsend	South Africa		28 August 1984	30 years, 30 days	27 September 2014	Jamina Winston Invitational	Mesa, Arizona	
35-39											
40-44											
45-49	51.30		Nicolas Granger	France							
50-54											
55-59	54.50		Jack Groselle	United States							
60-64	55.87		Jack Groselle	United States	Sarasota YMCA		60	17 May 2014	Canadian Masters Championships	Windsor, Ontario	
65-69	58.68		Richard Abrahams	United States	Colorado Masters		65 years, 259 days	4 December 2010	Southern Pacific Masters Regional Championships	Long Beach, California	
70-74	1:01.70		Richard Abrahams	United States	Colorado Masters		70 years, 58 days	17 December 2015	Canadian Masters Championships	Montreal	
75-79											
80-84	1:11.26		David Radcliff	United States	Oregon Masters		80	28 September 2014	LaCamas Headhunters Classic	Camas, Washington	
85-89											
90-94	1:39.26		Woody Bowersock					2003			
95-99											
100-104											
Men's 200m freestyle
25-29	1:44.90		Darian Townsend	South Africa		28 August 1984	29 years, 67 days	3 November 2013	Fall Invitational	Mesa, Arizona	
30-34	1:46.12		Darian Townsend	South Africa		28 August 1984	30 years, 30 days	27 September 2014	Jamina Winston Invitational	Mesa, Arizona	
35-39											
40-44											
45-49	1:52.87		Nicolas Granger	France							
50-54	1:54.61	r	Rowdy Gaines	United States	Blu Frog Masters	17 February 1959	52 years, 243 days	18 October 2011	Rowdy Gaines Masters Classic	Orlando, Florida	
55-59											
60-64	2:05.07		Jack Groselle	United States	Sarasota YMCA		60	18 May 2014	Canadian Masters Championships	Windsor, Ontario	
65-69											
70-74	2:22.60		David Quiggin	United States	Florida Aquatics Masters			12 October 2014	Rowdy Gaines Masters Classic	Orlando, Florida	
75-79											
80-84	2:38.35		David Radcliff	United States	Oregon Masters		80	28 September 2014	LaCamas Headhunters Classic	Camas, Washington	
85-89											
90-94											
95-99											
100-104											
Men's 400m freestyle
25-29											
30-34											
35-39											
40-44											
45-49	4:03.81		Nicolas Granger	France	Reims Champagne Natation		48	27 March 2015	French Masters Championships	Rennes, France	
50-54	4:07.99		Jim McConica	United States	Ventura County Masters			2000			
55-59											
60-64	4:35.11		Jack Groselle	United States				2 February 2014	Super Bowl Meet	Brighton, Michigan	
65-69	4:45.88		Jim McConica	United States	Ventura County Masters		64 years, 105 days	3 April 2015	Ontario Provincial Championships	Etobicoke, Canada	
70-74											
75-79											
80-84	5:39.27		David Radcliff	United States	Oregon Masters		80	9 March 2014		Oregon City, Oregon	
85-89											
90-94	7:46.30		Willard Lamb	United States	Oregon Masters		92	8 March 2014	Oregon City Spring Forward Meet	Oregon City, Oregon	
95-99											
100-104											
Men's 800m freestyle
25-29											
30-34											
35-39											
40-44	8:21.78		Alex Kostich	United States			41	4 December 2011	Southern Pacific Masters Championships	Long Beach, California	
45-49											
50-54											
55-59											
60-64	9:28.32		Jim McConica	United States	Ventura County Masters		61 years, 349 days	2 December 2012	Southern Pacific Championships	Long Beach, California	
65-69	9:53.06		Jim McConica	United States	Ventura County Masters		64 years, 106 days	4 April 2015	Ontario Provincial Championships	Etobicoke, Canada	
70-74											
75-79											
80-84	11:43.02	†	David Radcliff	United States	Oregon Masters		80	27 September 2014	LaCamas Headhunters Classic	Camas, Washington	
85-89											
90-94	16:04.18		Willard Lamb	United States	Oregon Masters		92	28 September 2014	LaCamas Headhunters Classic	Camas, Washington	
95-99											
100-104											
Men's 1500m freestyle
25-29											
30-34											
35-39											
40-44											
45-49											
50-54			Jim McConica	United States	Ventura County Masters						
55-59			Jim McConica	United States	Ventura County Masters						
60-64	18:24.21		Jim McConica	United States	Ventura County Masters		59 years, 350 days	4 December 2010	Southern Pacific Masters Regional Championships	Long Beach, California	
65-69	18:53.75		Jim McConica	United States	Ventura County Masters		64 years, 104 days	2 April 2015	Ontario Provincial Championships	Etobicoke, Canada	
70-74											
75-79											
80-84	21:59.53		David Radcliff	United States	Oregon Masters		80	27 September 2014	LaCamas Headhunters Classic	Camas, Washington	
85-89											
90-94	30:41.82		Willard Lamb	United States	Oregon Masters		92	27 September 2014	LaCamas Headhunters Classic	Camas, Washington	
95-99											
100-104											

==== Backstroke ====
Age group	Record		Athlete	Nationality	Club	Birthdate	Age	Date	Meet	Place	Ref
Men's 50m backstroke
25-29	24.55		Darian Townsend	South Africa		28.08.1984	29 years, 67 days	3 November 2013	Fall Invitational	Mesa, Arizona	
30-34											
35-39											
40-44											
45-49	27.02		Chris Stevenson	United States							
50-54	26.69		Fritz Bedford	United States	Vermont UVRays		52	25 October 2015	UVAC Leaf Peepers Masters Mini Meet	White River Junction, United States	
55-59	27.62	r	Steve Wood	United States	Central Florida			12 October 2015	Rowdy Gaines Masters Classic	Orlando, Florida	
60-64											
65-69	30.34		Hugh Wilder	United States	Santa Rosa Masters			2 December 2012	Southern Pacific Championships	Long Beach, California	
70-74	33.51		Richard Burns	United States	Tamalpais Masters		70	8 December 2013	Southern Pacific Masters Championships	Commerce, California	
75-79											
80-84											
85-89											
90-94											
95-99											
100-104	1:45.59		Jaring Timmerman	Canada				2009			
105-109	3:09.55		Jaring Timmerman	Canada				24 January 2014	Catherine Kerr Pentathlon	Winnipeg, Canada	
Men's 100m backstroke
25-29	53.38		David Russell	United States	Cambridge Masters			12 December 2014	New England Masters Championships	Boston	
30-34											
35-39											
40-44											
45-49											
50-54	58.47		Fritz Bedford	United States	Vermont UVRays		52	24 October 2015	UVAC Leaf Peepers Masters Mini Meet	White River Junction, United States	
55-59	1:00.78		Fritz Bedford	United States	New England Masters		55	21 October 2018	UVAC Leaf Peepers Masters Mini Meet	White River Junction, United States	
60-64	1:06.27		Tim Shead	United States	Gold Coast Masters			8 December 2012	New England Masters Championships	Boston	
65-69	1:07.69		Hugh Wilder	United States	Santa Rosa Masters			1 December 2012	Southern Pacific Championships	Long Beach, California	
70-74	1:12.09		Richard Burns	United States	Tamalpais Masters		70	7 December 2013	Southern Pacific Masters Championships	Commerce, California	
75-79											
80-84											
85-89											
90-94											
95-99											
100-104											
Men's 200m backstroke
25-29											
30-34											
35-39											
40-44											
45-49											
50-54											
55-59	2:15.79		Jamie Fowler	United States	Novaquatics Masters		55	7 December 2014	Southern Pacific Masters Championships	Commerce, California	
60-64	1:06.27		Tim Shead	United States	Gold Coast Masters			8 December 2012	New England Masters Championships	Boston	
65-69											
70-74	2:38.01		Richard Burns	United States	Tamalpais Masters		70	6 December 2013	Southern Pacific Masters Championships	Commerce, California	
75-79											
80-84											
85-89											
90-94	3:59.25		Goro Kobayashi	Japan							
95-99											
100-104											

==== Breaststroke ====
Age group	Record	Athlete	Nationality	Club	Birthdate	Age	Date	Meet	Place	Ref
Men's 50m breaststroke
25-29	27.31	Eetu Karvonen	Finland							
30-34										
35-39	27.79	Jeff Commings	United States				2009			
40-44	28.34	Jeff Commings	United States			41	31 October 2015	Ron Johnson Invitational	Phoenix, Arizona	
45-49	28.87	Ricco Rolli	Italy							
50-54	29.84	David Guthrie	United States	Longhorn Aquatics		53	6 December 2013	Southern Pacific Masters Championships	Commerce, California	
55-59	30.41	David Guthrie	United States	Longhorn Aquatics		55	8 November 2015	November Classic	Shenandoah, Texas	
60-64										
65-69	34.36	Robert Strand	United States			65	4 December 2011	Southern Pacific Masters Championships	Long Beach, California	
70-74	1:22.28	David Gildea	United States	Menlo Masters		70	13 October 2013	Pacific Masters Championships	Walnut Creek, California	
75-79										
80-84										
85-89										
90-94										
95-99										
100-104										
Men's 100m breaststroke
25-29	59.59	Ryo Kobayash	Japan							
30-34										
35-39										
40-44	1:01.42	Steve West	United States	Novaquatics Masters		42	7 December 2014	Southern Pacific Masters Championships	Commerce, California	
45-49	1:03.23	Nicolas Granger	France	Reims Champagne Natation		48	28 March 2015	French Masters Championships	Rennes, France	
50-54	1:04.54	David Guthrie	United States	Longhorn Aquatics		53	7 December 2013	Southern Pacific Masters Championships	Commerce, California	
55-59	1:07.25	David Guthrie	United States	Longhorn Aquatics		55	7 November 2015	November Classic	Shenandoah, Texas	
60-64	1:11.77	Tim Shead	United States	Gold Coast Masters			9 December 2012	New England Masters Championships	Boston	
65-69	1:15.84	Robert Strand	United States			66	2 December 2012	Southern Pacific Championships	Long Beach, California	
70-74										
75-79										
80-84										
85-89										
90-94										
95-99										
100-104										
Men's 200m breaststroke
25-29										
30-34										
35-39	2:14.36	Steve West	United States	Novaquatics Masters		39	7 December 2013	Southern Pacific Masters Championships	Commerce, California	
40-44	2:13.72	Steve West	United States	Novaquatics Masters		42	6 December 2014	Southern Pacific Masters Championships	Commerce, California	
45-49	2:18.91	Nicolas Granger	France	Reims Champagne Natation		48	27 March 2015	French Masters Championships	Rennes, France	
50-54	2:21.65	David Guthrie	United States	Longhorn Aquatics		53	8 December 2013	Southern Pacific Masters Championships	Commerce, California	
55-59	2:27.00	David Guthrie	United States	Longhorn Aquatics		55	8 November 2015	November Classic	Shenandoah, Texas	
60-64										
65-69	2:49.05	Robert Strand	United States			66	2 December 2012	Southern Pacific Championships	Long Beach, California	
70-74										
75-79										
80-84										
85-89	4:05.91	Frank Piemme	United States			85	4 December 2010	Southern Pacific Masters Regional Championships	Long Beach, California	
90-94										
95-99										
100-104										

==== Butterfly ====
Age group	Record		Athlete	Nationality	Club	Birthdate	Age	Date	Meet	Place	Ref
Men's 50m butterfly
25-29	23.53		Darian Townsend	South Africa		28 August 1984	29 years, 88 days	24 November 2013	Ron Johnson Invitational	Tempe, Arizona	
30-34											
35-39	23.70		Lars Frölander	Sweden	Linköpings ASS	26 May 1974	36 years, 298 days	20 March 2011	Swedish Masters Championships	Södertälje, Sweden	
40-44											
45-49	25.58		Jan Karlsson	Sweden			45	16 March 2013	Swedish Masters Championships	Södertälje, Sweden	
50-54											
55-59	26.45		Dan Thompson	Canada							
60-64	27.53		Donald Graham	United States			60	5 November 2014	North Carolina Masters Championships	Charlotte, North Carolina	
65-69											
70-74	29.52		Richard Abrahams	United States	Colorado Masters	20.03.1945	70 years, 206 days	12 October 2015	Rowdy Gaines Masters Classic	Orlando, Florida	
75-79											
80-84											
85-89											
90-94											
95-99											
100-104											
Men's 100m butterfly
25-29	52.45		Darian Townsend	South Africa		28 August 1984	29 years, 67 days	3 November 2013	Fall Invitational	Mesa, Arizona	
30-34											
35-39	54.27		Igor Marchenko	Russia	Novaquatics	26 November 1975	36 years, 8 days	4 December 2011	Southern Pacific Masters Championships	Long Beach, California	
40-44											
45-49	56.66		Nicolas Granger	France				5 April 2014	French Championships	Paris	
50-54											
55-59	59.11		Mark Weldon	New Zealand		19 September 1967	55 years, 355 days	9 September 2023			
60-64	1:00.02		Dan Thompson	Canada	Aurora Masterducks	15 June 1956	59 years, 340 days	20 May 2016	Masters Championships	Etobicoke, Canada	
65-69			Josep Claret	United States							
70-74	1:07.56	†	Richard Abrahams	United States	Colorado Masters	20 March 1945	70 years, 206 days	12 October 2015	Rowdy Gaines Masters Classic	Orlando, Florida	
75-79											
80-84											
85-89											
90-94											
95-99											
100-104											
Men's 200m butterfly
25-29											
30-34											
35-39	2:02.98		Brent Creager	United States	Penn State		35	15 November 2014	Ron Johnson Invitational	Tempe, Arizona	
40-44	2:02.97		Bill Specht	United States				1998			
45-49											
50-54	2:11.70		David Sims	United States	Illinois Masters			9 December 2012	New England Masters Championships	Boston	
55-59	2:15.97		Hugo Bregman	Netherlands	WVZ Zoetermeer	1958		27 January 2013	Open Dutch Masters Championships	Nijverdal, the Netherlands	
60-64											
65-69											
70-74											
75-79											
80-84											
85-89											
90-94	5:24.08		Tom Maine	United States	St. Louis Aquatic Masters		90	11 October 2015	Urbana Masters Meet	Urbana, Illinois	
95-99											
100-104											

==== Individual medley ====
Age group	Record	Athlete	Nationality	Club	Birthdate	Age	Date	Meet	Place	Ref
Men's 100m individual medley
25-29	53.47	Darian Townsend	South Africa		28 August 1984	29 years, 67 days	3 November 2013	Fall Invitational	Mesa, Arizona	
30-34	53.75	Darian Townsend	South Africa		28 August 1984	30 years, 30 days	27 September 2014	Jamina Winston Invitational	Mesa, Arizona	
35-39	56.36	Glenn Counts	United States	Las Vegas Masters			1 December 2012	Southern Pacific Championships	Long Beach, California	
40-44	57.19	Jeff Commings	United States			40	15 November 2014	Ron Johnson Invitational	Tempe, Arizona	
45-49	57.68	Nicolas Granger	France							
50-54	1:00.96	David Sims	United States	Illinois Masters			8 December 2012	New England Masters Championships	Boston	
55-59	1:01.76	Steve Wood	United States	Central Florida			12 October 2015	Rowdy Gaines Masters Classic	Orlando, Florida	
60-64										
65-69	1:09.90	Hubie Kerns	United States	Ventura County Masters		65	18 May 2014	Canadian Masters Championships	Windsor, Ontario	
70-74	1:13.09	Richard Abrahams	United States	Colorado Masters	20 March 1945	70 years, 206 days	12 October 2015	Rowdy Gaines Masters Classic	Orlando, Florida	
75-79										
80-84										
85-89										
90-94	2:08.86	Tokushi Komeda	Japan							
95-99	3:33.98	Gus Langner	United States				1998			
100-104										
Men's 200m individual medley
25-29	1:59.70	Christopher Gilchrist	United States							
30-34	1:57.68	Tamás Kerékjártó								
35-39										
40-44	4:30.68	Eric Christensen	United States	Florida Aquatics Masters			11 October 2014	Rowdy Gaines Masters Classic	Orlando, Florida	
45-49	2:04.64	Nicolas Granger	France				2012			
50-54	2:12.85	Jerome Frentsos	United States	Maryland Masters		50	17 May 2015	Canadian Masters Championships	Montreal	
55-59										
60-64	2:24.75	Jack Groselle	United States	Sarasota YMCA		60	16 May 2014	Canadian Masters Championships	Windsor, Ontario	
65-69	2:34.15	Hubie Kerns	United States	Ventura County Masters		65	16 May 2014	Canadian Masters Championships	Windsor, Ontario	
70-74										
75-79										
80-84										
85-89										
90-94										
95-99										
100-104										
Men's 400m individual medley
25-29										
30-34	4:13.68	Darian Townsend	United States		28 August 1984	31 years, 64 days	31 October 2015	Ron Johnson Invitational	Phoenix, Arizona	
35-39										
40-44										
45-49	4:31.36	Nicolas Granger	France				2012			
50-54	4:45.15	Jerome Frentsos	United States	Maryland Masters		50	18 May 2015	Canadian Masters Championships	Montreal	
55-59										
60-64										
65-69	5:34.78	Hubie Kerns	United States	Ventura County Masters		65	19 May 2014	Canadian Masters Championships	Windsor, Ontario	
70-74										
75-79										
80-84										
85-89										
90-94	9:49.61	Tom Maine	United States	St. Louis Aquatic Masters		90	11 October 2015	Urbana Masters Meet	Urbana, Illinois	
95-99										
100-104										

==== Relay ====
Relays: To be conducted on the total age of team members in whole years. Age groups of relay events are as follows: 100 - 119, 120 - 159, 160 - 199, 200 - 239, 240 - 279, 280 -319, 320 - 359, and ...(forty year increments as high as is necessary).

Age group	Record	Athlete	Nationality	Club	Birthdate	Age	Date	Meet	Place	Ref
Men's 4×50m freestyle
100-119										
120-159										
160-199										
200-239										
240-279	1:43.21	Richard Abrahams; Marc Middleton; Lucky Meisenheimer; Ross Bohlken	United States	Blue Frog Masters			13 October 2012	Rowdy Gaines Masters Classic	Orlando, Florida	
280-319										
320-359										
360-399	3:19.42		Japan	Juei Club			2008			
Men's 4 × 100 m freestyle
100-119										
120-159	3:31.30	C. Counts; Wegner; Gaines; G. Counts	United States	Las Vegas Masters			8 December 2013	Southern Pacific Masters Championships	Commerce, California	
160-199										
200-239										
240-279	3:56.97	Richard Abrahams; Marc Middleton; Lucky Meisenheimer; Ross Bohlken	United States	Blue Frog Masters			14 October 2012	Rowdy Gaines Masters Classic	Orlando, Florida	
280-319										
320-359	6:34.69	Donal Baker; Bob Best; Eric Hubach; Ken Kimball	United States	San Diego Swim Masters			1 December 2012	Southern Pacific Championships	Long Beach, California	
360-399	9:52.10	Rogers Holmes; William Adams; Edwin Graves; John Corse	United States	Florida Aquatics Masters		93; 88; 91; 90	12 October 2014	Rowdy Gaines Masters Classic	Orlando, Florida	
Men's 4 × 200 m freestyle
100-119										
120-159										
160-199										
200-239	8:03.40	Rowdy Gaines (1:54.61); Charlie Lydecker; Tim Buckley; Keith Switzer	United States	Blu Frog Masters	17 February 1959	52 years, 243 days	18 October 2011	Rowdy Gaines Masters Classic	Orlando, Florida	
240-279	8:52.73	Jack Groselle (2:06.81); Rick Walker (2:18.50); Kevin McCormack (2:17.08); Steven Newman (2:10.34)	United States	Sarasota YMCA Masters			7 November 2015	Shark Tank Meet	Sarasota, Florida	
280-319	10:28.15	Jose Ferraz; Cav Cavanaugh; Howard Rolston; David Quiggin	United States	Gold Coast Masters			18 October 2011	Rowdy Gaines Masters Classic	Orlando, Florida	
320-359	14:02.73	Bill Blake; Louis Raiborn; Graham Johnston; Joe Gray	United States	Masters of South Texas	10 July 1930	82 years, 249 days	2 December 2012	South Texas Championships	San Antonio, Texas	
360-399	21:24.39	Rogers Holmes; William Adams; Edwin Graves; John Corse	United States	Florida Aquatics Masters		93; 88; 91; 90	12 October 2014	Rowdy Gaines Masters Classic	Orlando, Florida	
Men's 4×50m medley
100-119	1:40.82	Simon Sjödin; Pontus Flodqvist; Christoffer Vikström; Petter Stymne	Sweden	SK Neptun	4 October 1986 2 February 1987 9 May 1983	26 years, 163 days26 years, 42 days 29 years, 311 days	16 March 2013	Swedish Masters Championships	Södertälje, Sweden	
120-159										
160-199										
200-239	1:49.42	Ande Rasmussen (27.82); David Guthrie (29.64); Jim Sauer (28.10); Mike Varozza (23.96)	United States	Longhorn Aquatics Masters		52	1 December 2012	South Texas Championships	San Antonio, Texas	
240-279										
280-319										
320-359										
360-399	4:15.49		Japan	Nishinomiya Sumire			2009			
Men's 4 × 100 m medley
100-119	3:43.64	Darian Townsend; Marcus Titus; Tyler DeBerry; Carl Miller	South Africa; United States; United States; United States	Tucson Ford Masters	28 August 1984; 20 May 1986	29 years, 88 days 27 years, 188 days	24 November 2013	Ron Johnson Invitational	Tempe, Arizona	
120-159										
160-199										
200-239	3:59.68	Ande Rasmussen (1:00.40); David Guthrie (1:05.60); Jim Sauer (1:01.22); Mike Varozza (52.46)	United States	Longhorn Aquatics		52 - -	1 December 2012	South Texas Championships	San Antonio, Texas	
240-279	4:30.90	Jim McConica (1:12.72); Hubie Kerns (1:17.69); Mike Shaffer (59.34); Glenn Gruber (1:01.15)	United States	Ventura County Masters		63 years, 353 days	7 December 2014	Southern Pacific Masters Championships	Commerce, California	
280-319	5:02.97	Erik Lokensgard (1:25.92); Kurt Olzmann (1:26.10); Larry Day (1:07.36); Chuck Olson (1:03.59)	United States	Michigan Masters			19 March 2017	Milford Athletic Club Masters Meet	Highland Township, Oakland County, Michigan	
320-359										
360-399										

Legend: # – Record awaiting ratification by FINA; e – equalled existing record;
Records not set in finals: h – heat; sf – semifinal; r – relay 1st leg; rh – relay heat 1st leg; b – B final; † – en route to final mark; so – swim-off; tt – time trial

=== Women ===
Key: Awaiting ratification

==== Freestyle ====
Age group	Record		Athlete	Nationality	Club	Birthdate	Age	Date	Meet	Place	Ref
Women's 50m freestyle
25-29											
30-34	24.30		Rebecca Guy	Great Britain				27 October 2023			
35-39											
40-44	26.07	r	Erika Braun	United States	North Carolina Masters		42	28 March 2014	Albatross Meet	North Bethesda, United States	
45-49	26.96	r	Marika Johansson	Sweden	SK Nautilus	26 May 1974		19 March 2011	Swedish Masters Championships	Södertälje, Sweden	
50-54	27.67	=	Sue Walsh	United States		1962		28 March 2014	Albatross Meet	North Bethesda, United States	
50-54	27.67	=	Maria Norberg	Sweden				28 March 2014	Swedish Masters Championships	Sundsvall, Sweden	
55-59	27.91	r	Sarah Macdonald	Canada	Victoria Masters Swim Club			18 May 2015	Canadian Masters Championships	Montreal	
60-64	29.23		Laura Val	United States	Tamalpais Aquatic Masters		62	7 December 2013	Southern Pacific Masters Championships	Commerce, California	
65-69	32.06		Diane O'Mara	United States	MI Masters		65	11 December 2011	New England Championships	Boston, Massachusetts	
70-74											
75-79											
80-84											
85-89											
90-94											
95-99											
100-104	1:34.12		Mieko Nagaoka	Japan			100	2014			
Women's 100m freestyle
25-29											
30-34	54.75		Erika Erndl	United States	T2 Aquatics			13 October 2012	Rowdy Gaines Masters Classic	Orlando, Florida	
35-39											
40-44	57.55		Susan Rapp	United States		5 July 65					
45-49											
50-54	1:01.41		Ellen Reynolds	United States	Sawtooth Masters		50	28 September 2014	LaCamas Headhunters Classic	Camas, Washington	
55-59	1:00.66		Karlyn Pipes	United States		18 March 1962	54 years, 308 days	20 January 2017	Open Dutch Masters Championships	Maastricht, Netherlands	
60-64	1:03.48		Laura Val	United States	Tamalpais Aquatic Masters		63	7 December 2014	Southern Pacific Masters Championships	Commerce, California	
65-69											
70-74											
75-79											
80-84											
85-89	1:43.97		Jean Troy	United States	Florida Maverick Masters			14 October 2012	Rowdy Gaines Masters Classic	Orlando, Florida	
90-94											
95-99											
100-104	3:30.49		Mieko Nagaka	Japan			100	2014			
Women's 200m freestyle
25-29											
30-34	2:00.58	r	Erika Erndl	United States	T2 Aquatics			14 October 2012	Rowdy Gaines Masters Classic	Orlando, Florida	
35-39											
40-44											
45-49											
50-54	2:10.72		Suzanne Heim-Bowen	United States							
55-59			Laura Val	United States	Tamalpais Aquatic Masters						
60-64	2:20.16		Laura Val	United States	Tamalpais Aquatic Masters			4 December 2011	Southern Pacific Masters Championships	Long Beach, California	
65-69	2:25.41	†	Laura Val	United States	Tamalpais Aquatic Masters		65	30 January 2016	The Olympic Club 1500 Swim Meet	San Francisco, California	
70-74											
75-79											
80-84											
85-89											
90-94											
95-99											
100-104	7:27.89		Mieko Nagaka	Japan			100	2014			
Women's 400m freestyle
25-29											
30-34	4:17.82		Dawn Heckman	United States				4 December 2011	Southern Pacific Masters Championships	Long Beach, California	
35-39											
40-44											
45-49											
50-54											
55-59			Laura Val	United States	Tamalpais Aquatic Masters						
60-64	4:55.54		Laura Val	United States	Tamalpais Aquatic Masters			18 October 2011	Pacific Masters Championships	Walnut Creek, California	
65-69	5:06.74	†	Laura Val	United States	Tamalpais Aquatic Masters		65	30 January 2016	The Olympic Club 1500 Swim Meet	San Francisco	
70-74											
75-79											
80-84											
85-89											
90-94											
95-99											
100-104	16:40.10		Mieko Nagaka	Japan			100	2014			
Women's 800m freestyle
25-29											
30-34	8:38.58		Dawn Heckman	United States				4 December 2011	Southern Pacific Masters Championships	Long Beach, California	
35-39											
40-44											
45-49											
50-54											
55-59			Laura Val	United States	Tamalpais Aquatic Masters						
60-64	10:21.68	†	Laura Val	United States	Tamalpais Aquatic Masters		60	15 January 2011	The Olympic Club 1500 Swim Meet	San Francisco	
65-69	10:34.67	†	Laura Val	United States	Tamalpais Aquatic Masters		65	30 January 2016	The Olympic Club 1500 Swim Meet	San Francisco	
70-74											
75-79											
80-84											
85-89											
90-94	18:38.60		Maurine Kornfeld	United States	Mission Viejo Masters		90	4 February 2011	Southern Pacific Masters Championships	Long Beach, California	
95-99											
100-104	36:51.2		Mieko Nagaka	Japan			100	2014			
Women's 1500m freestyle
25-29											
30-34	16:29.90		Dawn Heckman	United States				4 December 2011	Southern Pacific Masters Championships	Long Beach, California	
35-39											
40-44											
45-49											
50-54											
55-59	18:06.01		Lynn Marshall	Canada	Carleton University Masters		55	30 January 2016	The Olympic Club 1500 Swim Meet	San Francisco	
60-64	19:38.63		Laura Val	United States	Tamalpais Aquatic Masters		60	15 January 2011	The Olympic Club 1500 Swim Meet	San Francisco	
65-69	20:21.61		Laura Val	United States	Tamalpais Aquatic Masters		65	30 January 2016	The Olympic Club 1500 Swim Meet	San Francisco	
70-74											
75-79											
80-84											
85-89	30:51.51		Betty Lorenzi	United States	Florida Aquatic Combined Team			13 October 2012	Rowdy Gaines Masters Classic	Orlando, Florida	
90-94											
95-99											
100-104	1:15:54.39		Mieko Nagaka	Japan			100	4 April 2015		Matsuyma, Japan	

==== Backstroke ====
Age group	Record		Athlete	Nationality	Club	Birthdate	Age	Date	Meet	Place	Ref
Women's 50m backstroke
25-29											
30-34											
35-39	28.13	r	Noriko Inada	Japan		27 July 1978	35 years, 120 days	24 November 2013	Ron Johnson Invitational	Tempe, Arizona	
40-44											
45-49											
50-54	30.58		Leslie Livingston	United States	Patriot Masters		50	19 March 2011	Albatross Open	North Bethesda, United States	
55-59											
60-64	33.01		Laura Val	United States	Tamalpais Aquatic Masters		62	8 December 2013	Southern Pacific Masters Championships	Commerce, California	
65-69											
70-74	39.44		Elisabeth Ketelsen	Denmark				27 January 2013	Open Dutch Masters Championships	Nijverdal, the Netherlands	
75-79											
80-84											
85-89	51.75		Betty Lorenzi	United States	Florida Aquatic Combined Team			13 October 2012	Rowdy Gaines Masters Classic	Orlando, Florida	
90-94											
95-99											
100-104	1:38.71		Mieko Nagaka	Japan			100	2014			
Women's 100m backstroke
25-29											
30-34	1:02.52		Erika Erndl	United States	T2 Aquatics			13 October 2012	Rowdy Gaines Masters Classic	Orlando, Florida	
35-39	1:00.60	r	Noriko Inada	Japan		27 July 1978	35 years, 120 days	24 November 2013	Ron Johnson Invitational	Tempe, Arizona	
40-44											
45-49											
50-54	1:08.12		Karlyn Pipes-Neilsen	United States	Boulogne-Billancourt Aquatic Club	18 March 1962	49 years, 357 days	9 March 2012	French Masters Championships	Angers, France	
55-59	1:08.33		Karlyn Pipes	United States		18 March 1962	54 years, 308 days	20 January 2017	Open Dutch Masters Championships	Maastricht, Netherlands	
60-64	1:12.72		Laura Val	United States	Tamalpais Aquatic Masters		62	7 December 2013	Southern Pacific Masters Championships	Commerce, California	
65-69	1:17.95		Diann Uustal	United States	Maine Masters		65	11 December 2011	New England Championships	Boston	
70-74											
75-79											
80-84											
85-89	1:52.21		Betty Lorenzi	United States	Florida Aquatic Combined Team			14 October 2012	Rowdy Gaines Masters Classic	Orlando, Florida	
90-94											
95-99											
100-104	3:42.81		Mieko Nagaka	Japan			100	2014			
Women's 200m backstroke
25-29											
30-34											
35-39											
40-44											
45-49											
50-54											
55-59	2:29.22		Karlyn Pipes	United States		18 March 1962	54 years, 310 days	22 January 2017	Open Dutch Masters Championships	Maastricht, Netherlands	
60-64	2:41.71		Laura Val	United States	Tamalpais Aquatic Masters			1 December 2012	Southern Pacific Championships	Long Beach, California	
65-69											
70-74	3:11.41		Elisabeth Ketelsen	Denmark				26 January 2013	Open Dutch Masters Championships	Nijverdal, the Netherlands	
75-79											
80-84											
85-89											
90-94											
95-99											
100-104	7:40.01		Mieko Nagaka	Japan			100	2014			

==== Breaststroke ====
Age group	Record	Athlete	Nationality	Club	Birthdate	Age	Date	Meet	Place	Ref
Women's 50 m breaststroke
25-29	31.87	Megan Jendrick	United States	Pacific Northwest Aquatics	15 January 1984	26 years, 312 days	23 November 2010	Whidbey Island Masters	Oak Harbor, Washington	
30-34										
35-39										
40-44	33.40									
45-49	33.81	Anna Hammar	Sweden			45	17 March 2013	Swedish Masters Championships	Södertälje, Sweden	
50-54										
55-59										
60-64										
65-69										
70-74										
75-79										
80-84										
85-89										
90-94										
95-99										
100-104										
Women's 100 m breaststroke
25-29	1:08.82	Megan Jendrick	United States	Pacific Northwest Aquatics	15 January 1984	27 years, 31 days	15 February 2011	EBSC Swim Classic	Vancouver, Canada	
30-34										
35-39	1:10.64	Cynthia Lewis	United States	Novaquatics		36	4 December 2011	Southern Pacific Masters Championships	Long Beach, California	
40-44										
45-49	1:12.64	Anna Hammar	Sweden			45	16 March 2013	Swedish Masters Championships	Södertälje, Sweden	
50-54	1:13.95	Helen Gorman	Great Britain	City of Cardiff	27 November 1972	49 years, 225 days	10 July 2022	Barnet Copthall Masters Distance Meet	London, Great Britain	
55-59										
60-64										
65-69										
70-74										
75-79										
80-84										
85-89										
90-94										
95-99										
100-104										
Women's 200 m breaststroke
25-29	2:28.48	Megan Jendrick	United States	Pacific Northwest Aquatics	15 January 1984	27 years, 31 days	15 February 2011	EBSC Swim Classic	Vancouver, Canada	
30-34										
35-39										
40-44										
45-49	2:38.00	Susan von der Lippe	United States	Colorado Masters	5 July 1965	45 years, 139 days	21 November 2010	Ron Johnson Invitational	Tempe, Arizona	
50-54	2:41.45	Helen Gorman	Great Britain	City of Cardiff	27 November 1972	49 years, 336 days	29 October 2022	Swim England Masters Championships	Sheffield, Great Britain	
55-59										
60-64										
65-69										
70-74										
75-79										
80-84										
85-89										
90-94										
95-99										
100-104										

==== Butterfly ====
Age group	Record		Athlete	Nationality	Club	Birthdate	Age	Date	Meet	Place	Ref
Women's 50m butterfly
25-29	26.31		Claire Donahue	United States	South Florida Aquatic Club Masters	12 January 89	26 years, 273 days	12 October 2015	Rowdy Gaines Masters Classic	Orlando, Florida	
30-34											
35-39											
40-44	28.19		Erika Braun	United States	North Carolina Masters		41	17 March 2013	Albatross Open	North Bethesda, United States	
45-49											
50-54	29.54	†	Leslie Livingston	United States	Patriot Masters		51	25 March 2012	Albatross Open	Bethesda, Maryland	
55-59	31.13	=	Laura Val	United States	Tamalpais Aquatic Masters		58	2009			
55-59	31.13	=	Tracy Granger	United States			55	7 December 2013	Southern Pacific Masters Championships	Commerce, California	
60-64	33.30		Charlotte Davis	United States	Pacific Northwest		60	4 December 2010	Southern Pacific Masters Regional Championships	Long Beach, California	
65-69	34.53		Diann Uustal	United States	Georgia Masters			13 October 2013	Rowdy Gaines Masters Classic	Orlando, Florida	
70-74											
75-79											
80-84											
85-89											
90-94											
95-99											
100-104											
Women's 100m butterfly
25-29	59.16		Claire Donahue	United States	South Florida Aquatic Club Masters	12 January 89	26 years, 273 days	12 October 2015	Rowdy Gaines Masters Classic	Orlando, Florida	
30-34	1:00.11		Mette Jacobsen	Denmark							
35-39											
40-44											
45-49	1:03.47		Susan von der Lippe	United States	Colorado Masters	5 July 1965	45 years, 138 days	20 November 2010	Ron Johnson Invitational	Tempe, Arizona	
50-54	1:06.92		Karlyn Pipes-Neilsen	United States	Boulogne-Billancourt Aquatic Club		27 years, 31 days	9 March 2012	French Masters Championships	Angers, France	
55-59	1:08.15		Karlyn Pipes	United States		18 March 1962	54 years, 309 days	21 January 2017	Open Dutch Masters Championships	Maastricht, Netherlands	
60-64	1:11.47		Laura Val	United States	Tamalpais Aquatic Masters		62	8 December 2013	Southern Pacific Masters Championships	Commerce, California	
65-69											
70-74											
75-79											
80-84											
85-89											
90-94											
95-99											
100-104											
Women's 200m butterfly
25-29											
30-34											
35-39											
40-44											
45-49											
50-54											
55-59											
60-64	2:41.25		Laura Val	United States	Tamalpais Aquatic Masters			4 December 2011	Southern Pacific Masters Championships	Long Beach, California	
65-69	3:15.63		Carolyn Boak	United States	Woodlands Masters			10 November 2012	November Classic	The Woodlands, Texas	
70-74											
75-79											
80-84											
85-89											
90-94											
95-99											
100-104											

==== Individual medley ====
Age group	Record	Athlete	Nationality	Club	Birthdate	Age	Date	Meet	Place	Ref
Women's 100m individual medley
25-29	1:02.89	Megan Jendrick	United States	Pacific Northwest Aquatics	15 January 1984	27 years, 31 days	15 February 2011	EBSC Swim Classic	Vancouver, Canada	
30-34	1:02.15	Erica Morningstar	Canada	Wild Rose Swim Club	3 March 1989	34 years, 85 days	27 May 2023	Canadian Masters Nationals	Calgary, Alberta	
35-39										
40-44	1:04.19	Lisa Blackburn	Bermuda	South Florida			10 October 2015	Rowdy Gaines Masters Classic	Orlando, Florida	
45-49										
50-54	1:08.28	Karlyn Pipes-Neilsen	United States	Boulogne-Billancourt Aquatic Club		27 years, 31 days	9 March 2012	French Masters Championships	Angers, France	
55-59	1:09.08	Karlyn Pipes	United States		18 March 1962	54 years, 309 days	21 January 2017	Open Dutch Masters Championships	Maastricht, Netherlands	
60-64	1:16.37	Laura Val	United States	Tamalpais Aquatic Masters			4 December 2011	Southern Pacific Masters Championships	Long Beach, California	
65-69	1:20.86	Diann Uustal	United States	Maine Masters		65	11 December 2011	New England Championships	Boston	
70-74										
75-79										
80-84										
85-89	2:09.72	Jean Troy	United States	Florida Maverick Masters			14 October 2012	Rowdy Gaines Masters Classic	Orlando, Florida	
90-94	2:09.47	Jane Asher	Great Britain	King’s Cormorants	20 March 1931	91 years, 223 days	29 October 2022	Swim England Masters National Championships	Sheffield, United Kingdom	
95-99										
100-104										
Women's 200m individual medley
25-29										
30-34										
35-39										
40-44	2:19.83									
45-49										
50-54	2:28.62	Ellen Reynolds	United States	Sawtooth Masters		50	28 September 2014	LaCamas Headhunters Classic	Camas, Washington	
55-59	2:31.04	Karlyn Pipes	United States		18 March 1962	54 years, 316 days	28 January 2017	French National Team Championships	Cholet, France	
60-64	2:41.53	Laura Val	United States	Tamalpais Aquatic Masters		62	6 December 2013	Southern Pacific Masters Championships	Commerce, California	
65-69	3:04.22	Carolyn Boak	United States	Woodlands Masters Swim Team			4 December 2010	South Central Regional SCM Championships	San Antonio, Texas	
70-74										
75-79										
80-84										
85-89										
90-94										
95-99										
100-104										
Women's 400m individual medley
25-29										
30-34										
35-39										
40-44										
45-49										
50-54	5:10.96	Ellen Reynolds	United States	Sawtooth Masters		50	27 September 2014	LaCamas Headhunters Classic	Camas, Washington	
55-59										
60-64	5:57.70	Charlotte Davis	United States	Pacific Northwest		60	5 December 2010	Southern Pacific Masters Regional Championships	Long Beach, California	
65-69	6:31.71	Carolyn Boak	United States	Woodlands Masters Swim Team			5 December 2010	South Central Regional SCM Championships	San Antonio, Texas	
70-74										
75-79										
80-84										
85-89	10:13.73	Jean Troy	United States	Florida Maverick Masters			13 October 2012	Rowdy Gaines Masters Classic	Orlando, Florida	
90-94										
95-99										
100-104										

==== Relay ====
Age group	Record	Athlete	Nationality	Club	Birthdate	Age	Date	Meet	Place	Ref
Women's 4×50m freestyle
100-119										
120-159										
160-199	1:48.08	Sue Walsh (28.02); Jennifer Stringer (26.79); Alicia Uhl (27.27); Erika Braun (26.00)	United States	North Carolina Masters	1962	51; 37; 36; 40	9 November 2013	North Carolina Masters State Championships	Charlotte, North Carolina	
200-239	1:55.60	Lynn Morrison; Kristin Henderson; Maureen Rea; Stephanie Stone	United States	Texas Lonestars			8 November 2015	November Classic	Shenandoah, Texas	
240-279	1:59.66	Lynn Morrison (31.39); Heidi Ernst (28.87); Jacki Hirsty (30.79); Kristin Henderson (28.61)	United States	Texas Lonestars			7 November 2015	November Classic	Shenandoah, Texas	
280-319										
320-359										
360-399										
Women's 4 × 100 m freestyle
100-119	4:04.38	Kelsey Wilson (1:01.55); Kelsey Roggensack (1:01.78); Ildiko Szekely (1:01.59); Elizabeth Mancuso (59.46)	United States	Boston University Masters		22; 24; 35; 29	13 December 2014	New England Masters Championships	Boston	
120-159										
160-199										
200-239	4:33.91	Osborn; Murphy; O'Brien; Curran	United States	Walnut Creek Masters			18 October 2011	Pacific Masters Championships	Walnut Creek, United States	
240-279	4:38.25	Lynn Morrison (1:08.19); Jacki Hirsty (1:09.75); Heidi Ernst (1:15.20); Kristin Henderson (1:05.11)	United States	Texas Lonestars			8 November 2015	November Classic	Shenandoah, Texas	
280-319										
320-359										
360-399										
Women's 4 × 200 m freestyle
100-119										
120-159										
160-199										
200-239	9:29.43	Hibben; Ciraulo; Dodd; Stebbins	United States	UCLA Bruins			7 December 2013	Southern Pacific Masters Championships	Commerce, California	
240-279	10:25.22	Kristin Henderson (2:29.51); Lynn Morrison (2:39.23); Heidi Ernst (2:42.21); Jacki Hirsty (2:34.27)	United States	Texas Lonestars			7 November 2015	November Classic	Shenandoah, Texas	
280-319										
320-359										
360-399										
Women's 4×50m medley
100-119										
120-159										
160-199										
200-239										
240-279	2:29.05	Maureen Hughes; Danielle Ogier; Pat Sargeant; Jeannie Mitchell	United States	Gold Coast Masters			18 October 2011	Rowdy Gaines Masters Classic	Orlando, Florida	
280-319										
320-359										
360-399										
Women's 4 × 100m medley
100-119										
120-159										
160-199	4:36.25	Tracey McFarlane; Brooke Bennett; Danielle Chance; Cathy Shonkwiler	United States	Blue Frog Masters	20 July 1966; 6 May 1980	46 years, 86 days 32 years, 161 days	14 October 2012	Rowdy Gaines Masters Classic	Orlando, Florida	
200-239	4:48.61	Stephanie Stone (1:09.19); Maureen Rea (1:26.74); Mize (1:04.91); Lynn Morrison (1:07.77)	United States	Texas Lonestars			8 November 2015	November Classic	Shenandoah, Texas	
240-279										
280-319	6:12.17	Helen Trippe; Amanda Heath; Esther Iseppi; Diane Ford	Great Britain	Spencer			29 October 2022	Swim England Masters Championships	Sheffield, Great Britain	
320-359										
360-399										

=== Mixed Relay ===
Age group	Record	Athlete	Nationality	Club	Birthdate	Age	Date	Meet	Place	Ref
Mixed 4×50m freestyle
100-119	1:38.76	Richard Knight; Scott MacDougall; Annie Brown; Rebecca Guy	Great Britain	Bristol Henleaze			29 October 2023	Swim England Masters Championships	Sheffield, Great Britain	
120-159										
160-199										
200-239	1:46.08	Erika Braun; Sue Walsh; Jon Blank; Jonathan Klein	United States				28 March 2014	Albatross Meet	North Bethesda, United States	
240-279										
280-319										
320-359										
360-399										
Mixed 4 × 100 m freestyle
100-119	3:44.84	Dorr; Reilly; Bishop; Holsman	United States	The Olympic Club			4 December 2011	Southern Pacific Masters Championships	Long Beach, California	
120-159										
160-199										
200-239										
240-279	4:07.34	Hubie Kerns; Glenn Gruber; Jim McConica; Michael Blatt	United States	Ventura County Masters			4 December 2011	Southern Pacific Masters Championships	Long Beach, California	
280-319										
320-359										
360-399										
Mixed 4 × 200 m freestyle
100-119	8:31.00	Tyler DeBerry; Tim Gendler; Meghan Bullock; Erin Morrison	United States	Ford Aquatics			24 November 2013	Ron Johnson Invitational	Tempe, Arizona	
120-159	8:25.57	Cynthia Lewis; Evan Kraus; Amy Collins; Dickie Fernandez	United States	Novaquatics Masters			1 December 2012	Southern Pacific Championships	Long Beach, California	
160-199										
200-239	8:36.91	Liz Dillmann (2:11.86); David Sims (1:58.35); A. J. Block (2:22.08); Jim Tuchler (2:04.62)	United States	Illinois Masters		50; 53; 54; 50	11 October 2015	Urbana Masters Meet	Urbana, Illinois	
240-279	9:09.49	Kerns; Gruber; McConica; Blatt	United States	Ventura County Masters			4 December 2011	Southern Pacific Masters Championships	Long Beach, California	
280-319	12:33.48	Dale Webster; Jackie Marr; Gynt Clifford; Bill Behun	United States	San Diego Masters			5 December 2010	Southern Pacific Masters Regional Championships	Long Beach, California	
320-359										
360-399										
Mixed 4×50m medley
100-119	1:45.63	Takahisa Yamamoto; Yuki Takasaki; Rizumu Kizawa; Tatsuya Ito	Japan	Queendom			21 May 2023			
120-159	1:46.39	Takahisa Yamamoto; Yuki Takasaki; Rizumu Kizawa; Tatsuya Ito	Japan	Queendom			24 February 2025			
160-199										
200-239	1:57.65	Richard Abrahams; Sheri Hart; Danielle Chance; Marc Middleton	United States	Blue Frog Masters			14 October 2012	Rowdy Gaines Masters Classic	Orlando, Florida	
240-279										
280-319										
320-359										
360-399										
Mixed 4 × 100 m medley
100-119										
120-159	4:06.60	Noriko Inada (1:00.60); Jeff Commings; Erin Campbell; Jan Konarzewski	Japan; United States; United States; United States	Phoenix Swim Club	27 July 1978	35 years, 120 days	24 November 2013	Ron Johnson Invitational	Tempe, Arizona	
160-199										
200-239	4:23.63	Jim Tuchler (1:02.93); David Sims (1:10.46); A. J. Block (1:09.97); Liz Dillmann (1:00.27)	United States	Illinois Masters		50; 53; 54; 50	11 October 2015	Urbana Masters Meet	Urbana, Illinois	
240-279										
280-319										
320-359	6:57.50	Webster; Hoppe; Williams; Kimball	United States	San Diego Masters			4 December 2011	Southern Pacific Masters Championships	Long Beach, California	
360-399										

Legend: # – Record awaiting ratification by FINA; e – equalled existing record;
Records not set in finals: h – heat; sf – semifinal; r – relay 1st leg; rh – relay heat 1st leg; b – B final; † – en route to final mark; so – swim-off; tt – time trial
