= Karlyn Pipes =

American swimmer (born 1962)

Personal information
- Born: March 18, 1962 (age 64) Lompoc, California, U.S.

Sport
- Sport: Swimming
- Strokes: Backstroke, butterfly, freestyle, breaststroke, individual medley
- Club: Coronado Navy Swim Association
- College team: California State University, Bakersfield (CSUB) Roadrunners

Karlyn Pipes (born March 18, 1962), formerly Karlyn Pipes-Neilsen, is an American swimmer from Lompoc, California. In Masters-level swimming she is one of the most decorated athletes in the history of the sport and was inducted into the International Swimming Hall of Fame in 2015, and the Hawaii Swimming Hall of Fame in 2018.

== Early life ==
Pipes was born in 1962 in Lompoc, California, and learned to swim by taking classes at the local YMCA at the age of four. By the age of six, she had competed in her first race for the Lompoc Marlins. In 1970, Pipes moved to Chula Vista, CA a city south of San Diego and swam for the Chula Vista Aquatic Association (CVAA). At the age of 12, Pipes changed teams and joined the Coronado Navy Swim Association to be coached by two-time Olympic Gold medalist Mike Troy. At the age of 15, Pipes won the 400-yard individual medley at the National Junior Olympic Swimming Championships and as a result was invited to attend the first-ever Junior Development camp at the US Olympic Training Center in Colorado Springs, CO. She graduated from Coronado High School in 1980. Pipes was offered 15 full-ride scholarships to NCAA Division I schools and accepted one from the University of Arkansas.

== Career ==
By the age of 19, her party lifestyle, "poor work ethic" and "lack of discipline" caused her to forfeit her scholarship at Arkansas after three semesters. Pipes describes the next chapter of her life as the "lost years" when her addictive tendencies took over and her life began to spiral out of control. For the next 11 years Pipes dropped out of college six times and had many seasonal jobs. On April 16, 1993, at the age of 31, Pipes entered a ten-day alcohol and drug rehabilitation program at Sharp Cabrillo Hospital. Immediately upon her release, Pipes returned to the water to help her recover, heal and regain lost strength. Three months later, she stepped up on the blocks to race again and began competing in U.S. Masters Swimming competitions. After six months of sobriety, Pipes established a new FINA world record in the 200-meter backstroke. By the end of her first year of Masters competition, she ranked first in the U.S. in seven events and added three more world records to her cache. In 1995, she set a total of 16 FINA Masters world records for the 30–34 age group, competing against many former Olympians. By the time she was 35, she was ranked first in the United States in every distance and stroke in 54 official events in the 35-39 age group and came within a few tenths of a second to qualify for the 1996 US Olympic Trials in the 200-meter backstroke.

In 1995, she restarted her collegiate swimming career by competing for Palomar Junior College. Over the next two years she held a 4.0 GPA, broke every women's school record but one, set 4 National and 5 State Community College records and was twice named the Pacific Coast Conference Swimmer of the Year. In 1997, Pipes accepted a full athletic scholarship to attend Cal State Bakersfield, where she graduated cum laude with a BS in communications in 1999. While at Bakersfield, Pipes swam for coach Pat Skehan and helped the Lady Roadrunners to second place finish at the National Division II Championships. Pipes also became the oldest athlete, at age 36, to set an NCAA record, with a time 2:00.54 in the 200-yard backstroke, which remained the NCAA Division II record until 2001. In addition, she won three individual NCAA Division II titles in the 100-yard backstroke, 200 and 400-yard medley. Her time in 400-medley was eight seconds faster than the time she posted at age 15 to win the National Junior Olympics. Pipes was awarded Division II All-American honors in eight separate events over her collegiate career. After her college eligibility expired, at the age of 36, Karlyn became a professional athlete earning prize money at competitions swimming against women half her age.

In 2002, Pipes set 25 FINA World records, 54 National records, achieved 6 lifetime best times and became the first woman over forty years old to complete the 500-yard freestyle event in less than five minutes with a time of 4:58.98. Stunningly, this time was quicker than the record of 4:59.08, which she had set for the 30–34 age group in 1996.

She has set FINA Masters world records in all four strokes, as well as in the medley and at every distance offered. Pipes's records stand the test of time and currently span six age-groups reaching back over twenty five years. She also competed at four FINA Masters World Championships starting with Montreal, Canada in 1994. Stanford in Palo Alto, CA in 2006, Perth, Australia in 2008, and Riccione, Italy in 2012 winning all twenty events she entered.

As of December, 2020, Pipes has set 229 FINA Masters records with 25 still standing, and 354 U.S. Masters Swimming national records, of which 64 are still current. She also owns six long-distance records and is a 20-time USMS All-Star achieved by earning the most #1 rankings in an age-group in a year. After over three decades of swimming in the US Masters category, Pipes has become one of the most decorated swimmers in the history of the sport. "

== Personal life ==
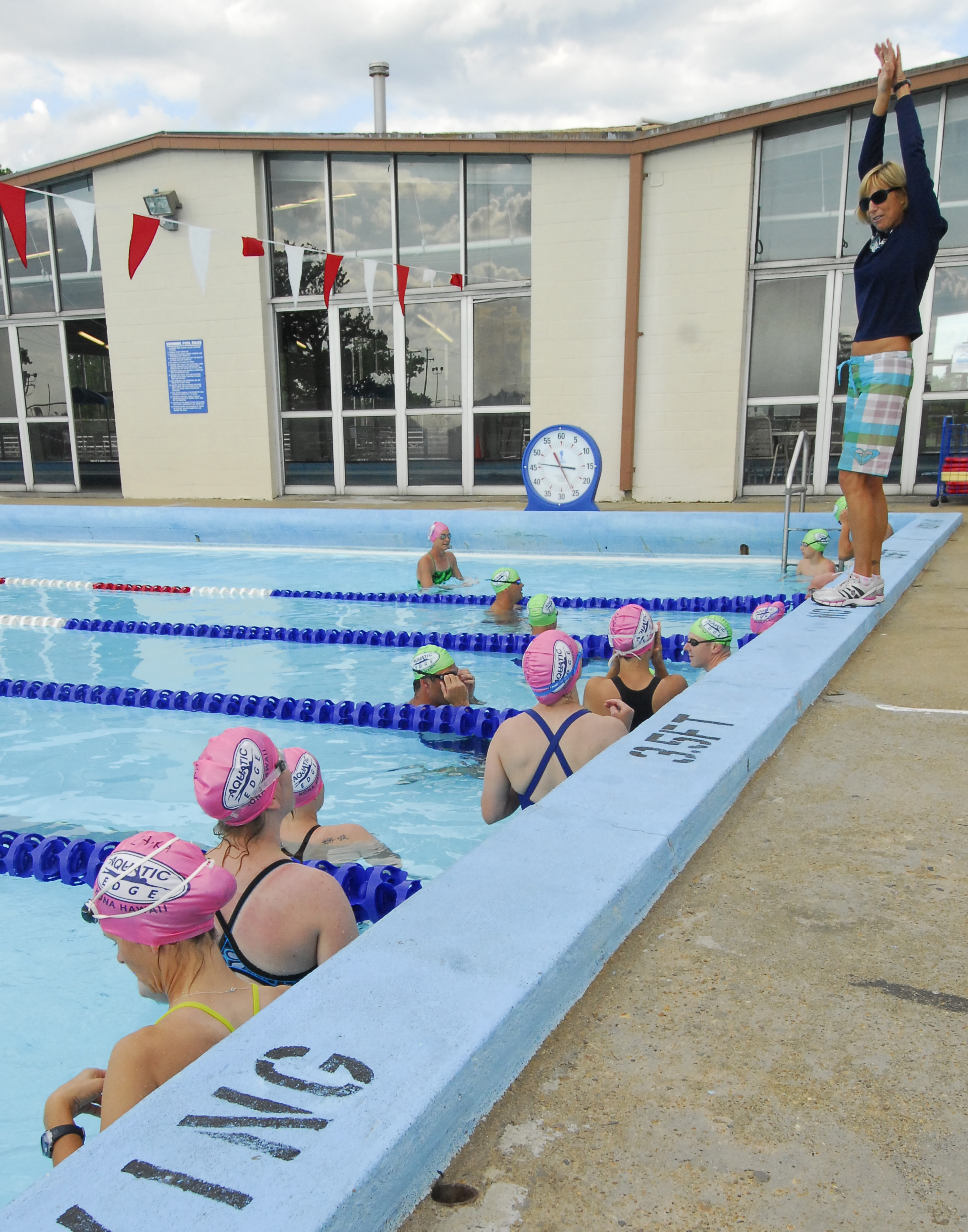
Karlyn Pipes, right, teaches service members and their families freestyle swimming techniques at a clinic on Naval Station in Norfolk, VA in 2011

In 1995, she married Eric Neilsen, a former water-polo-player turned triathlete who would serve as her swim coach for the next fourteen years. After their wedding ceremony, more than 100 guests swam a half-mile Open water race in the ocean while wearing celebratory custom swim caps that said "Eric and Karlyn's Wedding and Rough Water Swim." The couple divorced in 2009.

Pipes is currently a competitive swimmer as well as a triathlete, inspirational speaker and swim technique expert. She lives in Kona, Hawaii. She owns Aquatic Edge, a mobile service that offers Faster Freestyle swim technique workshops worldwide, as well as private swim instruction and Aloha Swim Camps in Kona, Hawaii.

As a writer, Pipes penned a monthly column entitled "The Pool's Edge" for Swimming World magazine from 2007 to 2012, and has been a contributor to the West Hawaii Today newspaper and SWIMMER Magazine. In 2015, along with contributing author Tito Morales, she wrote "The Do-Over: My Journey from the Depths of Addiction to World Champion Swimmer,” an autobiography about her struggles and victories over addiction.

== Awards ==
- Hawaii Swimming Hall of Fame class of 2018
- International Swimming Hall of Fame inductee class of 2015
- International Masters Swimming Hall of Fame inductee class of 2007
- Voted Top Ten Masters swimmer of All-Time by Swimming World Magazine
- Has broken 229 FINA Masters world records to date
- 354 U.S. Masters national records to date
- 2009, 2008, 2007 & 2004 World Masters Swimmer of the Year by Swimming World Magazine
- Currently holds 25 FINA Masters World and 64 U.S. Masters National records
- 611 time USMS All-American achieved by earning #1 national ranking in an event
- Female USMS Swimmer of the Year 1997, 2002 & 2003
- San Diego Hall of Champions Amateur Star of the Month 1995, 1997, 1998, 2000 & 2002

== See also ==
- List of members of the International Swimming Hall of Fame
