= USMS =

USMS may refer to:

- United States Mail Service or United States Postal Service
- United States Maritime Service, agency within the United States Department of Transportation
- United States Marshals Service, federal law enforcement agency within the United States Department of Justice
- U.S. Masters Swimming, swimming tournament in the United States
- University School of Management Studies, business school within the Guru Gobind Singh Indraprastha University, Delhi, India
