= June Krauser =

American swimmer (1926–2014)

Personal information
- Nationality: American
- Born: June 13, 1926 Indianapolis, Indiana, U.S.
- Died: August 2, 2014 (aged 88) Pompano Beach, Florida, U.S.

Sport
- Sport: Swimming
- Strokes: Butterfly, freestyle, breaststroke
- College team: Purdue University

June Krauser (June 13, 1926 – August 2, 2014) was an American swimmer. Known as the "Mother of Masters Swimming," she was one of the founders of U.S. Masters Swimming and set 154 national records and 73 world records. She was inducted into the International Swimming Hall of Fame in 1994.

== Early years ==
Krauser was born in 1926 at Indianapolis, Indiana. Her parents, Robert Fogle and Florence (Piepgras) Fogle were from Chicago. Krauser won national AAU swimming events in her youth, including a national championship in the breaststroke, and swam for Purdue University in the 1940s. She was considered "likely to compete" in the 1944 Summer Olympics, but the games were not held due to the ongoing world war. After World War II, Krauser married and had two children.

== Masters swimming ==
Krauser remained active in swimming throughout her life and was appointed in 1964 to the United States Olympic Women's Swim Committee. She also helped draft the rules and regulations for the Special Olympics in the late 1960s.

She gained her greatest fame in connection with masters swimming. Along with Ransom J. Arthur, M.D., and John Spannuth, Krauser was one of the founders of U.S. Masters Swimming (USMS). In the early 1970s, Spannuth approached her about the need for competitive swimming for adults. Krauser helped organize the group and drafted its rules. She became known as the "Mother of Masters Swimming."

At age 45, she began a "comeback" in swimming, and competed until she retired at age 80 in 2006. She was an active competitor in masters swimming from the 1970s through the 2000s. Between 1972 and 2001, she set 154 national records recognized by the USMS. She also set 73 world records. Her simple explanation to the Miami Herald for setting so many records: "I moved up in age divisions ... Once every five years I break lots of records."

Back in the 1990s, Krauser told the New York Times that for her swimming was "more interesting" than golfing with geriatric women.

John Spannuth of the Amateur Athletic Union said that Krauser "literally wrote the book when it came to competitive swimming for adults and for the Special Olympics, and did more to kick-start those two programs than anyone will ever know." Krauser was inducted into the International Swimming Hall of Fame in 1994. Likewise, she is in the Masters Swimming Hall of Fame and the Broward County Sports Hall of Fame.

== Later years and death ==
Such were her accomplishments that swimming legends Buster Crabbe and Johnny Weissmuller, contemporaries who "looked up to her," were among her friends.

She was the editor of Swim Master newsletter for about 20 years.

Krauser died in August 2014 at the age of 88, in Pompano Beach, Florida, from complications of Parkinson's disease.

== See also ==
- List of members of the International Swimming Hall of Fame
- List of masters athletes
- List of Masters world records in swimming
- Masters athletics
