= Susan von der Lippe =

American swimmer (born 1965)

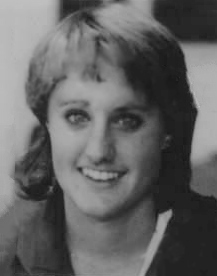
- Rapp in 1984

Personal information
- Full name: Susan von der Lippe
- National team: United States
- Born: July 5, 1965 (age 61) Eden Prairie, Minnesota, U.S.
- Height: 5 ft 10 in (1.78 m)
- Weight: 146 lb (66 kg)
- Spouse: Paul Von der Lippe

Sport
- Sport: Swimming
- Strokes: breaststroke, medley
- Club: Starlit Aquatic Club
- College team: Stanford University
- Coach: Holger Dietz (Starlit); George Haines (Stanford)
Medal record
Representing the United States
Olympic Games
| Gold medal – first place | 1984 Los Angeles | 4×100m medley |
| Silver medal – second place | 1984 Los Angeles | 200 m breaststroke |
Pan American Games
| Silver medal – second place | 1983 Caracas | 200 m breaststroke |
| Bronze medal – third place | 1983 Caracas | 200 m medley |

Susan von der Lippe (née Susan Gerard Rapp on July 5, 1965) was an American competition swimmer for Stanford University, a 1984 Olympic gold and silver medalist, and a United States Masters world record-holder in multiple events.

== Early swimming ==
Rapp was born in Eden Prairie, Minnesota, on July 5, 1965 to parents Edward and Trudy Rapp. In 1973, at the age of eight she began training and competing as part of Starlit Aquatic Club in Fairfax, Virginia and continued through the early 1980's. She grew up in Alexandria, Virginia, close to Fairfax's Starlit Aquatic where her primary coach was Holger Dietz. She and her three sisters swam in the program at one point, and though the pools were not especially modern or accommodating, the program produced a number of exceptional swimmers and was a premier club. Starlit featured a weight room and both a 25-yard and 50-meter pool, but folded in the 1980's due to financial issues that resulted in maintenance problems with the facilities. Susan's older sister Betsy, who swam for Starlit, would later swim for Stanford, and her sister Kris was also a swimmer.

The family moved to Minnesota in Fall, 1982, when her father, Edward, received a military transfer, and in 1983, she graduated from Eden Prairie High School, in Eden Prairie, Minnesota. In Eden Prairie, she swam for the Eden Prairie Foxjets U.S. Swimming Club under Coach Dave Storer. The family moved away from Minnesota in 1985, and settled in Colorado, though Susan had started her studies at Stanford by the Fall of 1983.

== 1980 Olympic trials ==
On July 31, 1980, at the U.S. Swimming Nationals and Olympic Trials in Irvine, California, while swimming for Starlit Aquatic Club at the age of 15, she placed third in the 200-meter breaststroke with a time of 2:35.08, though first place finisher Tracy Caulkins, in a tie with Terri Baxter, finished only around half a second ahead of her. Rapp placed third in the 100-meter breaststroke with a 1:12.93 once again behind Tracy Caulkins and Baxter. Her sisters Jenny and Betsy also competed in stroke events at the trials, but were not selected for the U.S. Olympic team.

Though she qualified for the 1980 Olympic games in Moscow, Rapp was unable to compete due to the United States-led boycott of the Olympic games hosted by the Soviet Union.

== Stanford University ==
Beginning in the fall of 1983, she attended Stanford University, on a swimming scholarship where she swam for the Stanford Cardinal swimming and diving team in National Collegiate Athletic Association (NCAA) and Pacific-10 Conference competition. Von der Lippe won NCAA titles in the 200-yard breaststroke in both 1984 and 1987. Diverse in her stroke skills, in 1986 she won an NCAA title in the 200-yard individual medley. At Stanford, Rapp received varsity letters in swimming in 1984 and from 1986–88, as she did not swim in 1985. She served as Captain from 1987–88, and captured a total of four NCAA titles during her career at Stanford, which consisted of three individual and one relay title. She was a Pac-10 Conference champion six times. During her collegiate swimming career, she was mentored by Hall of Fame Coach George Haines who coached the Stanford Women's team from around 1982-1988, and started the Santa Clara Swim Club, an exceptional age group program, in 1951. By 1988, she earned a Masters Degree in Sociology from Stanford.

Her most widely publicized international title was at the 1983 Pan Pacific Games in Venezuela where she won a bronze medal in the 200-meter Individual Medley with a time of 2:18.76, and a silver in the 200-meter butterfly with a time of 2:39.91 . She also competed at the 1986 World Championships.

After completing her time at Stanford, she married Paul von der Lippe, moved to Colorado, and began a career in marketing. After her children were born, she focused on a career as a homemaker, though her considerable focus on high level training with United States Masters Swimming also consumed some of her time. Returning to work by 1999, she served as a marketing manager for Colorado Time Systems.

== 1984 Olympic gold and silver medals ==
At the 1984 Summer Olympics in Los Angeles, she had significant success. She won a silver medal for her second-place performance in the women's 200-meter breaststroke, with a time of 2:31.15, finishing only .77 seconds behind the first place Canadian, Ann Ottenbrite who won Canada's first gold medal in swimming. Rapp moved up from sixth place in the early race, and in the last lap moved from third to second.

She earned a gold medal at the 84 Olympics by swimming for the winning U.S. team in the preliminary heats of the women's 4×100-meter medley relay. The Dutch team, a close rival, was eliminated in a preliminary round due to a disqualification when a member started before their teammate had fully finished their leg and touched the wall. Another close rival, the Australian team, were disqualified in a preliminary round for the same reason. The U.S. team led from the first leg, winning in a combined time of 4:08.34, to finish ahead of second-place West Germany by 3.5 seconds, a significant margin.

In individual competition, she finished seventh in the final of the women's 100-meter breaststroke, recording a time of 1:11.45.

In 1985, von der Lippe had surgery on both knees, due to inflamed ligaments largely from the rigors of breaststroke training and competition, but was able to make the U.S. World Championship team in 1986, after a year of recovery.

=== 1988 Olympics ===
At the 1988 Summer Olympics in Seoul, South Korea, Rapp competed in the B Final of the women's 200-meter breaststroke, finishing thirteenth overall with a time of 2:32.90.

=== 2008 Olympic trials ===
At the age of 42 while swimming for the Loveland Swim Club in Loveland, Colorado, a part of Colorado Masters, von der Lippe qualified for the 2008 U.S. Olympic Trials in the 100-meter breaststroke and 100-meter butterfly. She met the immediate requirements for making the trials at the age of 40, at the Western Region Long Course Championships on July 16, 2005, where she swam a 1:12.49 in the 100 breaststroke, .01 seconds below the Olympic qualifying time, and a world record time for her age group. At the age of 40, she become the oldest person at the time to qualify for the U.S. Olympic Swimming trials. Her prior 100-meter breaststroke time which qualified her for the 1980 Olympics at age 15 was remarkably a half a second slower than the time she swam to qualify for the 2008 Olympics at age 50.

In the 90's, Rapp raised a family, trained, and instructed at a few swim clinics that often featured other Olympians, including one in June, 1994, in Ocala, Florida, where she teamed with Olympians Jill Johnson and Sean Killion. In August 1999, she served as an instructor at a U.S. Swimming Gold Medal Clinic in Missoula, Montana. In July 2021, she welcomed guests and signed autographs with other Olympians at the official July opening of the U.S. Olympic and Paralympic Museum in Colorado Springs, Colorado. She instructed at another USA Gold Medal Swimming Clinic in McAllen, Texas in August 2000.

Returning to the workforce, in 2018 Von der Lippe worked with SwimLabs in Fort Collins, Colorado, where she taught young swimmers to swim, and provided competitive lessons. She operated her own marketing company, www.igbbmarketing.com.

=== U.S. Masters Swimming ===
As of 2014, von der Lippe holds 61 individual U.S. Masters Swimming pool records, across the 35–39, 40–44 and 45–49 age groups. She holds Masters World records in breaststroke, butterfly, and individual medley in the 40–44 and 45–49 age groups. Showing exceptional dominance and stroke diversity in December 2005, at the age of 40 she set U.S. Masters's world record age group marks, in the 50 meter, 100 meter and 200-meter events. She also set world records in the 50 and 100-meter fly, and came close to setting records in the 100 free, 200 fly and 100 IM.

=== Honors ===
von der Lippe was inducted in the Stanford University Athletic Hall of Fame in April, 2020.

== See also ==
- List of Masters world records in swimming
- List of Olympic medalists in swimming (women)
- List of Stanford University people
