= David Radcliff =

American swimmer (born 1934)

Personal information
- Full name: David Allison Radcliff
- National team: United States
- Born: May 1, 1934 (age 92) Spokane, Washington, U.S.
- Education: U. Cal. Berkeley (B.A. 1954); Los Angeles State (Teaching, 1959)
- Occupations: High School Teacher, Coach; High School Administrator
- Height: 5 ft 7 in (1.70 m)
- Weight: 152 lb (69 kg)
- Spouse: Nancy Elizabeth Dunn (1959)
- Children: 2

Sport
- Sport: Swimming
- Events: Freestyle Distance; 1500-meter freestyle
- Strokes: Freestyle
- Club: San Diego Swim. Association (SDSA)
- College team: University of California, Berkeley
- Coach: Bill Lucas (San Diego Swim); George Schroth (Berkeley)

David Allison Radcliff, sometimes appearing as David Radcliffe, (born May 1, 1934) is an American swimmer who competed for the University of California Berkeley, and represented the United States at the 1956 Summer Olympics in Melbourne, Australia where he competed in the men's 1,500-meter freestyle placing eleventh overall. After marriage in 1959, and beginning a career as a high school teacher and coach, at the age of 61 Radcliff returned to swimming competition in 1995 with United States Masters swimming, setting 48 individual Master's age group records during his Master's career. Excelling particularly in freestyle events as an older competitor, he has held at one time, all Master's freestyle world records for the 75-79 and 80-84 age groups from 50 to 1500 meters, with the exception of the 50-meter long course event.

== Early life and family ==
David A. Radcliff was born May 1, 1934 in Spokane, Washington the younger of two sons to the Reverend Edwin Radcliff and his wife. Reverend Radcliff began working with Westminster Presbyterian Church in 1952 near Venice, California when David was 18, and had been planning to work as a missionary in 1930 when he was first married. David's father, Reverend Radcliff worked as a missionary in Istanbul, Turkey when David's older brother was born around 1931.

David Radcliff learned to swim at an early age, with some of his earliest swimming experiences in scenic Hayden Lake in Hayden Lake, Idaho, about 40 miles East of his birthplace in Spokane, Washington. In the late 1940's his family moved to San Diego, California, where he later attended and graduated San Diego High School around 1951, one of the oldest High Schools in California. During his High School years, he became an All-American competing in swimming by his Senior year. In Club competition, Radcliff swam for San Diego Swimming Association under Coach Bill Lucas. Swimming for the San Diego Swimming Association in August of 1952, Radcliff set a meet record at the Fiestabahia Swimming Championship for the 440-yard freestyle with a time of 4:47.3.

== U. California Berkeley ==
Radcliff competed in swimming for the University of California Berkeley, enrolling around the Fall of 1951 and graduating around 1955. At Berkeley, he was managed in swimming primarily by Head Coach George Schroth. During his college years, Radcliff also played for Berkeley's strong water polo team, also managed by Coach Schroth, who was a USA Water Polo Hall of Fame inductee. On June 14, 1953, as a Freshman, he won the mile competition at the Healdsburg Swimming Championships in Healdsburg, California outside Santa Rosa with a time of 22:24.3. During his years as a Berkeley upperclassman, he was named an All-American in both 1954 and 1955.

After graduating Berkeley, Radcliff entered the U.S. Army in 1955, where he continued to have opportunities to train in swimming. In 1955, he swam in exhibitions and clinics with the Army for a two month period in Southeast Asia, an experience he later recalled enjoying. After leaving the Army in 1955, he obtained his teaching credentials from Los Angeles State College.

== 1956 Olympic trials ==
At the August, 1956 Olympic swimming trials in Detroit, Michigan, Radcliff finished third in the finals of the 1500-meter freestyle with a personal best time of 19:17.5, qualifying him for a place on the Olympic team. Performing beyond expectations, Radcliff's finals time was a full 18 seconds faster than his qualifying time for the trial finals of 19:35.6, placing him ahead of around five competitors who had also made the trial finals. American George Breen took first place in the event with a time of 18:13.7. Already a member of the U.S. Army, Radcliff trained for the Melbourne Olympics, to be held that November, while part of the Sixth Army at Fort McArthur outside Los Angeles at the Olympic pool in Los Angeles and at the Memorial Pool in Culver City, California, another greater Los Angeles suburb.

== 1956 Melbourne Olympics ==
Radcliffe competed in the preliminary heats of the men's 1,500-meter freestyle, at the November, 1956 Melbourne Olympics recording a time of 19:09.6, and finishing eleventh overall. At the Olympics, Radcliff was managed by Head U.S. Olympic Coach Bob Muir. Muir had coached John Kennedy during his time swimming as a Freshman at Harvard, and would coach swimming at Williams College from 1936-1966.

=== Marriage ===
On April 10, 1959, Racliff married Nancy Elizabeth Dunn, formerly of Burbank, California, at the Westminster United Presbyterian Church, with Radcliff's father, the Reverend Edward Radcliff performing the ceremony. Nancy attended Burbank High School and San Fernando Valley State College. A reception was held at Westminster Church, and the couple honeymooned at Malibu Beach. They raised two children, with their first a daughter, and retired to Hillsboro, Oregon, after Radcliff retired from his career as a High School educator and administrator in Southern California.

=== Careers ===
After his more competitive swimming career, Radcliff worked as a High School teacher, coach, and administrator. From around 1959-1962, he taught Social Studies at Las Vegas High School where he also coached the swimming team. In 1962, he taught Social Studies at Culver City Junior High.

=== U.S. Master's Swimming ===
In 1995, Radcliff returned to competition as a Masters swimmer. At the time, he swam for the Tualatin Hills Baracudas United States Masters Club. As of November 2014, he holds 42 individual U.S. Masters Swimming records in pool events; he has held all freestyle world records for the 75-79 and 80-84 age groups, from 50m to 1500m, other than the long course 50m freestyle. His 1500m freestyle World Record time at age 80 was 22:16.90, only 3 minutes slower than his time in the 1956 Olympics.

At 81, on August 20, 2015, Radcliff participated in the Old Man and the Sea Relay Swim with five other swimmers over the age of 80 and one alternate over 80 years of age. The swim went from Santa Catalina Island to San Pedro, California, a suburb of Los Angeles, a distance of approximately 22 miles, with Radcliff's relay finishing the distance in a time of 12 hours, 15 minutes and 23 seconds. The water temperature was in the low 70's, a full 10 degrees warmer than usual. In 2015, the team received the Relay of the Year Award from the Marathon Swimmer's Federation.

=== Honors ===
Radcliffe has been honored as an inductee to the International Swimming Hall of Fame as a Masters Swimmer, and was named an All-American by United States Masters Swimming eighteen times.
