= Betty Brussel =

Canadian swimmer (born 1924)

Personal information
- Born: July 28, 1924 (age 102) Zaandam, Netherlands

Sport
- Sport: Swimming
- Strokes: Freestyle, Breaststroke, Backstroke
- Club: White Rock Wave

Betty Brussel (born July 28, 1924) is a Dutch-Canadian competitive swimmer. She has set a total of five world records, three of which were established on January 20, 2024. She is a centenarian.

== Athletic career ==
Brussel started swimming competitively when she was 68. That year, she joined a swim club with her husband. She competed in the BC Seniors Games in the 1990s. In 2019, Brussel competed in the BC Masters Provincial Championships where she won seven gold medals. She also set the world record in the 95–99 age category for the 50-metre breaststroke. In 2022, she won the Ted Simpson Award at an event in South Surrey. In 2023, she won the Swimming Excellence Award at a competition in Calgary.

On January 20, 2024, Brussel earned three world records for the 100–104 age group, swimming the 50 metre breaststroke in 1 minute 56.22 seconds, 50 metre backstroke in 1 minute 25.22 seconds, and the 400 metre freestyle in 12 minutes and 50 seconds (four minutes faster than the previous record). In April 2024, she set an age group record for the 800 metre freestyle with a time of 26 minutes and 17 seconds in a Masters swimming competition. She broke these records in the 100-to-104-year-old age category at the age of 99, because the age group cutoff is based on birth year rather than exact age. Few swimmers of Brussel's age have ever competed, and she has been the first in her age group to finish a certain distance. As of 2024, Brussel trains twice a week and is the oldest member of the White Rock Wave Swim Team, a competitive Canadian masters swim team.

A documentary about Brussel's life, produced by Hannah Walsh and Emma Puchniak and funded through Kickstarter, was released in 2024.

== Personal life ==
Brussel was born in Zaandam, Netherlands in 1924. She dropped out of high school during World War II to care for her ten younger siblings. She first learned how to swim in a canal near Amsterdam. Her family could not afford to pay for swim lessons. She married her husband Gerrit in 1949 and they emigrated to Canada in 1959 where she worked as a seamstress. Brussel had three children while living in Grand Forks, British Columbia. Brussel retired in 1982 and now lives in New Westminster. Besides swimming, she is an avid reader and enjoys knitting and cross-stitching.

== See also ==
- List of world records in swimming
- List of world records in athletics
