= Fritz Bedford =

American swimmer

Personal information
- Born: 1963 (age 62–63)

Sport
- Sport: Swimming
- Strokes: Freestyle, backstroke, butterfly

Fritz C. Bedford (born 1963) is a competitive American swimmer who currently holds eight U.S. national records and has held seven world records.

== College ==
Bedford attended St. Lawrence University where he was a nineteen time All-American. This included all four years in both the 50-meter freestyle and 400-meter medley relay. He qualified for the NCAA Championships as an individual all four years. He was the New York state champion in the 50-meter freestyle and 200-meter backstroke as an individual and the 400 medley relay. He was named Outstanding Male Senior Athlete in 1985 and inducted into the university's Hall of Fame in 2006. While at St. Lawrence he joined Sigma Pi fraternity. He earned his master's degree from the University of New Hampshire and his PhD from the University of Wisconsin.

== Masters ==
Bedford began swimming in the Masters in 2009.

=== U.S. records held ===
| Age group | Event | Time | Age | Date | Current | Ref |
|---|---|---|---|---|---|---|
| 45–49 | 50 Fly (SCM) | 25.74 | 46 | December 13, 2009 | Yes | |
| 50–54 | 50 Back (SCY) | 24.57 | 50 | May 4, 2014 | Yes | |
| 50–54 | 100 Back (SCY) | 52.72 | 52 | March 21, 2015 | Yes | |
| 50–54 | 50 Back (SCM) | 26.69 | 53 | October 24, 2015 | Yes | |
| 50–54 | 100 Back (SCM) | 58.47 | 53 | October 24, 2015 | Yes | |
| 55–59 | 50 Back (SCY) | 25.30 | 55 | March 23, 2019 | Yes | |
| 55–59 | 100 Back (SCM) | 1.00.78 | 55 | October 20, 2018 | Yes | |
| 55–59 | 50 Fly (SCM) | 26.55 | 55 | October 20, 2018 | Yes | |

=== World records held ===
| Age group | Event | Time | Age | Date | Current | Ref |
|---|---|---|---|---|---|---|
| 45–49 | 50 Free (SCM) | 23.80 | 46 | December 13, 2009 | No | |
| 45–49 | 50 Fly (SCM) | 25.74 | 46 | December 13, 2009 | No | |
| 50–54 | 50 Back (SCM) | 27.36 | 50 | October 26, 2013 | No | |
| 50–54 | 100 Back (SCM) | 59.91 | 50 | October 26, 2013 | No | |
| 50–54 | 100 Back (SCM) | 58.47 | 52 | October 24, 2015 | No | |
| 50–54 | 50 Back (SCM) | 26.69 | 52 | October 24, 2015 | No | |
| 55–59 | 100 Back (SCM) | 1.00.78 | 55 | October 20, 2018 | Yes | |

SCM – Short Course Meters
SCY – Short Course Yards

== Personal ==
Bedford works as a mechanical engineer and is the brother of Olympian BJ Bedford.
