= George Corones =

Australian swimmer (1918–2020)

Personal information
- Full name: George Corones
- Nationality: Australia
- Born: 6 April 1918 Queensland, Australia
- Died: 28 March 2020 (aged 101)

Sport
- Sport: Swimming
- Strokes: Freestyle, breaststroke

George Corones (6 April 1918 – 28 March 2020) was an Australian senior swimmer who broke the world 50 and 100 metres freestyle records for his age group in February/March 2018.

Born in Charleville, Queensland, of Greek descent, and whose residence is in Albany Creek. Corones gave up swimming before the Second World War, made his career as a medical practitioner, then resumed swimming only after his 80th birthday.

Corones competed at the 2012 World Championships in Italy, with top-three finishes in various 90-94 age group events. In February 2013, Corones smashed two world 95-99 class freestyle records at the Masters Swimming Queensland Meet held on the Gold Coast, Queensland.

At the Commonwealth Games trials held at the Gold Coast Aquatic Centre, Queensland, Australia, on 28 February 2018, Corones swam 50 metres in 56.12 seconds, breaking the previous record for 100- to 104-year-olds by 35 seconds, taking the record from Britain's John Harrison who had set a 1:31.19 mark in 2014. He also set the world record 100 metre mark at 2:24.21 at the same swim meet on 3 March 2018. He entered the trials as National and Queensland state record holder for five events - the 25, 50 and 100 metres freestyle and 25 and 50 metres breaststroke - having set those records the previous January.

Corones trained at the Albany Creek Swim Club. He turned 100 in April 2018 and died in March 2020 at 101.

Event	Time	Date	Location
50 m Freestyle	56.12	28 February 2018	Gold Coast, Queensland, Australia
100 m Freestyle	2:24.21	3 March 2018	Gold Coast, Queensland, Australia

Records
Preceded by John Harrison	Men's 50-metre freestyle Q100-104 world record-holder 28 February 2018 –	Succeeded by incumbent
Preceded by	Men's 100-metre freestyle Q100-104 world record-holder 3 March 2018 –	Succeeded by incumbent

== See also ==
- Masters swimming
