= Jane Asher (swimmer) =

British Masters swimmer

Jane Asher BEM
Personal information
- Nickname: Super Gran
- Born: 20 March 1931 (age 95) Nkana, Northern Rhodesia

Sport
- Sport: Swimming

Jane Asher BEM (born 20 March 1931) is a British Masters swimmer. During her career, Asher won over 20 gold medals at the FINA Masters World Championships and broke a hundred Masters records. She was inducted into the International Swimming Hall of Fame in 2006 and awarded the British Empire Medal at the 2018 Birthday Honours.

== Early life and education ==
In 1931, Asher was born in Nkana, Northern Rhodesia (now Zambia). Her mother was a ballerina while her father was a soldier in World War I. After moving to Johannesburg, South Africa, as a child with her family, she attended Rhodes University and studied social sciences. After graduating from Rhodes, Asher went to Manchester University to study personnel management for her post-graduate in 1953.

== Career ==
Asher began swimming as a child and participated in her first swim meet at the age of 17. After swimming for Manchester University, she became a piece work supervisor in Norwich and stopped swimming when she became a parent. Asher resumed her swimming career during the 1950s as a children's swim instructor. In Norwich, she taught swimming for the Norwich Penguins during the 1970s and gave swim lessons to high school students in the 1980s.

In 1986, Asher broke her first world record in masters swimming. As a Masters swimmer, Asher broke 75 Masters records before she was inducted into the International Swimming Hall of Fame in 2006. Her Masters record total had grown to 100 when she turned 80 years old in 2011. Apart from world records, Asher has won over 20 gold medals at the FINA Masters World Championships.

== Awards and honours ==
Asher was named one of the top World Masters swimmers of the year by Swimming World in 2004. She subsequently appeared on the magazine's list for 2006, 2011, and 2016. For honours, Asher was inducted into the International Swimming Hall of Fame in 2006. She was awarded a British Empire Medal at the 2018 Birthday Honours.

== See also ==
- List of members of the International Swimming Hall of Fame
