= U.S. Masters Swimming =

- Abbreviation: USMS
- Formation: 1970; 56 years ago
- Type: Amateur Sports Organization
- Purpose: Organized adult swimming in the U.S.
- Headquarters: Sarasota, Florida, U.S.
- Region served: United States
- Members: 60,000+
- Official language: English
- CEO: Dawson Hughes
- Affiliations: United States Aquatic Sports
- Staff: 18
- Website: www.usms.org

U.S. Masters Swimming (USMS), founded in 1970, is a national membership nonprofit supporting masters swimming in the United States. The program began when the first National Masters Swimming Championships were held on May 2, 1970 at the Amarillo Aquatic Club pool with a few dozen swimmers. Captain Ransom J. Arthur, M.D., a San Diego Navy doctor, had persuaded John Spannuth, President of American Swimming Coaches Association, that the event would give older swimmers (ex-competitors and beginners) a goal for keeping physically fit. Arthur's mission of encouraging adults to improve fitness through swimming has grown over the years into a nationwide organization that currently includes more than 60,000 adult swimmers.

Members participate in a variety of ways ranging from lap swimming to international competition. The program is organized by USMS, which provides organized workouts, competitions, clinics, and workshops for adults aged 18 and over. Programs are open to all adult swimmers (fitness, triathlete, competitive, noncompetitive) who are dedicated to improving their fitness through swimming. To be eligible for USMS competition, swimmers must sign up with USMS and obtain a membership card for a fee that varies by location.

== Competition ==
Although there are more than 500 local and regional competitions around the country that are available for Masters swimmers to participate in, less than half of the members compete in these meets. However, for those that do, there are a variety of events to choose from including pool meets, ePostal swims, and open water swims. Two national championship pool meets are held each year, which help to determine the USMS Top 10—the top 10 fastest times in the nation in pool meets that are sanctioned or recognized by USMS during the current season and is organized by age, sex and course. The swimmer with the fastest time in the USMS Top 10 in each age group, event, and course, plus the age group winners of the long distance events are further named to the All-American list. In each age group, the swimmer with the most All-American titles is named an All-Star. All of the results from the competitions, as well as a record of the USMS Top 10, All-Americans and the All-Stars are recorded and maintained on the web in the USMS Archives.

== History ==
Captain Ransom J. Arthur, a San Diego Navy doctor, had persuaded John Spannuth, President of American Swimming Coaches Association, that the event would give older swimmers (ex-competitors and beginners) a goal for keeping physically fit. In the early 1970s, Spannuth approached American swimmer June Krauser about the need for competitive swimming for adults. With Arthur and Spannuth, she founded USMS. Krauser helped organize the group and drafted its rules. She became known as the "Mother of Masters Swimming."

Krauser was an active competitor in masters swimming from the 1970s through the 2000s. Between 1972 and 2001, she set 154 national records recognized by the USMS.

Spannuth said that Krauser "literally wrote the book when it came to competitive swimming for adults and for the Special Olympics, and did more to kick-start those two programs than anyone will ever know." Masters Swimming Hall of Fame inducted Krauser.

=== Transgender participation ===
Historically, USMS allowed trans athletes to participate and compete as their gender provided that they met certain hormonal and transition prerequisites. On July 1, 2025, however, USMS replaced this with new guidance allowing them to participate, but not allowing them to place for the purposes of competition. Despite this, three weeks later the states of Florida and Texas filed suit against USMS for allowing trans women to participate as women, Texas citing consumer protection laws on deceptive trade practices in doing so while Florida alleged public nuisance and discrimination.

== Online resources ==
=== YouTube channel ===
U.S. Masters Swimming has a YouTube channel it started October 28, 2008 where it posts videos to help grow the expertise in those interested in swimming. Videos published range from breaking down nebulous concepts into more tangible terms, such as the journey of a masters swimmer, to more technical videos providing instructional guidance on such topics as how to put on a swim cap and how to circle swim.

== See also ==
- Masters swimming
- Swimming pool § Competition pools
- United States Aquatic Sports
- USA Swimming
