= Masters swimming =

Competitive swimming for over 25 year olds

Masters swimming is a special class of competitive swimming for swimmers 25 years and older. Premasters is normally included as well, from 18 years old (Canada, United States, United Kingdom and Australia) or 20 years old (Europe).

In Canada ten thousand swimmers in more than 250 clubs are organized within the Masters Swimming Canada organization. In the United States around sixty thousand masters swimmers are supported by U.S. Masters Swimming, in more than 1,500 masters swimming clubs or workout groups.

== Rules ==
The rules and distances are nearly the same as for senior swimming, but "breaststroke kicking movement is permitted for butterfly", and meet programs include mixed relay events (2 men / 2 women). The latter one is now copied by seniors.

== Age categories ==
Individual swimmers compete within age groups of five years, determined by the swimmer's age on 31 December current year (in U.S. for meets held in non-metric pools, the age is determined as of the day of the competition). The age groups are: A:25–29 (years old), B:30–34, C:35–39, D:40–44; E:45–49; F:50–54, G:55–59; H:60–64, I:65–69, J:70–74; K:75–79; L:80–84, M:85–89, N:90–94, P:95–99, Q:100–104, R:105–109 and so on at 5-year increments as necessary. In 2014 Jaring Timmermann from Canada, at the age of 105, set a world record as the oldest, but he died the same year.

For Masters relay events, the age groups are determined by the combined age of the team participants in 40 years increments. This allows swimmers of different ages to compete together in a team, as long as each swimmer is Masters (at least 25 years old). Combined age groups are: A:100–119 (years old), B:120–159, C:160–199, D:200–239, E:240–279, F:280–319, G:320–359 and so on if ever necessary.

== Description ==
Masters swimming is a fast-growing leisure activity, particularly in North America, Australia, and increasingly in Europe. Most towns or cities now have masters clubs. Typically these are friendly and welcome newcomers. The minimum requirements to join a masters club vary widely, anywhere from the ability to swim one length of the pool to the ability to swim a kilometre without stopping. Club members will follow a set of different drills and swims each time typically covering anything from 1.5 km to 3.5 km per one-hour session. Each club will have lanes and so whilst the younger and faster swimmers who are competing nationally and regionally are at one end, the other lanes are for hobbyists who may have taken up swimming quite recently.

U.S. Masters Swimming is the governing body of masters swimming in the United States, sponsoring competition at all levels. In addition, it sponsors programs for non-competitive "fitness" swimmers who train primarily for the health benefits that the activity offers to the aging athlete. Masters Swimming Canada is the governing body of masters swimming in Canada, listing swim clubs, competitions and provincial master swim associations.

== FINA World Masters Championships ==
FINA organizes the FINA World Masters Championships since 1986, but 2 editions were held in the pre-FINA era:

- 1978 – Toronto, CAN (non-FINA)
- 1984 – Christchurch, NZL (non-FINA)

Number	Year	Location	Dates
1	1986	Tokyo, Japan	12–16 July
2	1988	Brisbane, Australia	10–15 October
3	1990	Rio de Janeiro, Brazil	6–13 August
4	1992	(United States) Indianapolis, USA	25 June – 5 July
5	1994	Montreal, Canada	4–10 July
6	1996	(United Kingdom) Sheffield, Great Britain	23 June – 3 July
7	1998	Casablanca, Morocco	19–30 June
8	2000	Munich, Germany	29 July – 4 August
9	2002	Christchurch, New Zealand	21 March – 3 April
10	2004	Riccione, Italy	1–13 June
11	2006	(United States) Stanford, USA	4–17 August
12	2008	Perth, Australia	18–25 April
13	2010	Gothenburg and Borås, Sweden	27 July – 7 August
14	2012	Riccione, Italy	3–17 June
15	2014	Montreal, Canada	27 July – 10 August
16	2015	Kazan, Russia	5–16 August
17	2017	Budapest, Hungary	7–20 August
18	2019	Gwangju, South Korea	5–18 August
19	2021	Fukuoka, Japan	2–11 August
20	2023	Doha, Qatar	23 Feb – 3 March
21	2025	Singapore	7–14 August

== Records ==
As in senior swimming, there are world records for masters swimming, but they can only be set in a sanctioned masters meet. Official list of Masters swimming records are available at the FINA website masters section.

== See also ==
- European Masters Swimming Championships
- June Krauser, "Mother of Masters swimming"
- Masters (athletics)
- Swimming
