= Emirgan Pier =

Emirgan Pier Emirgan İskelesi
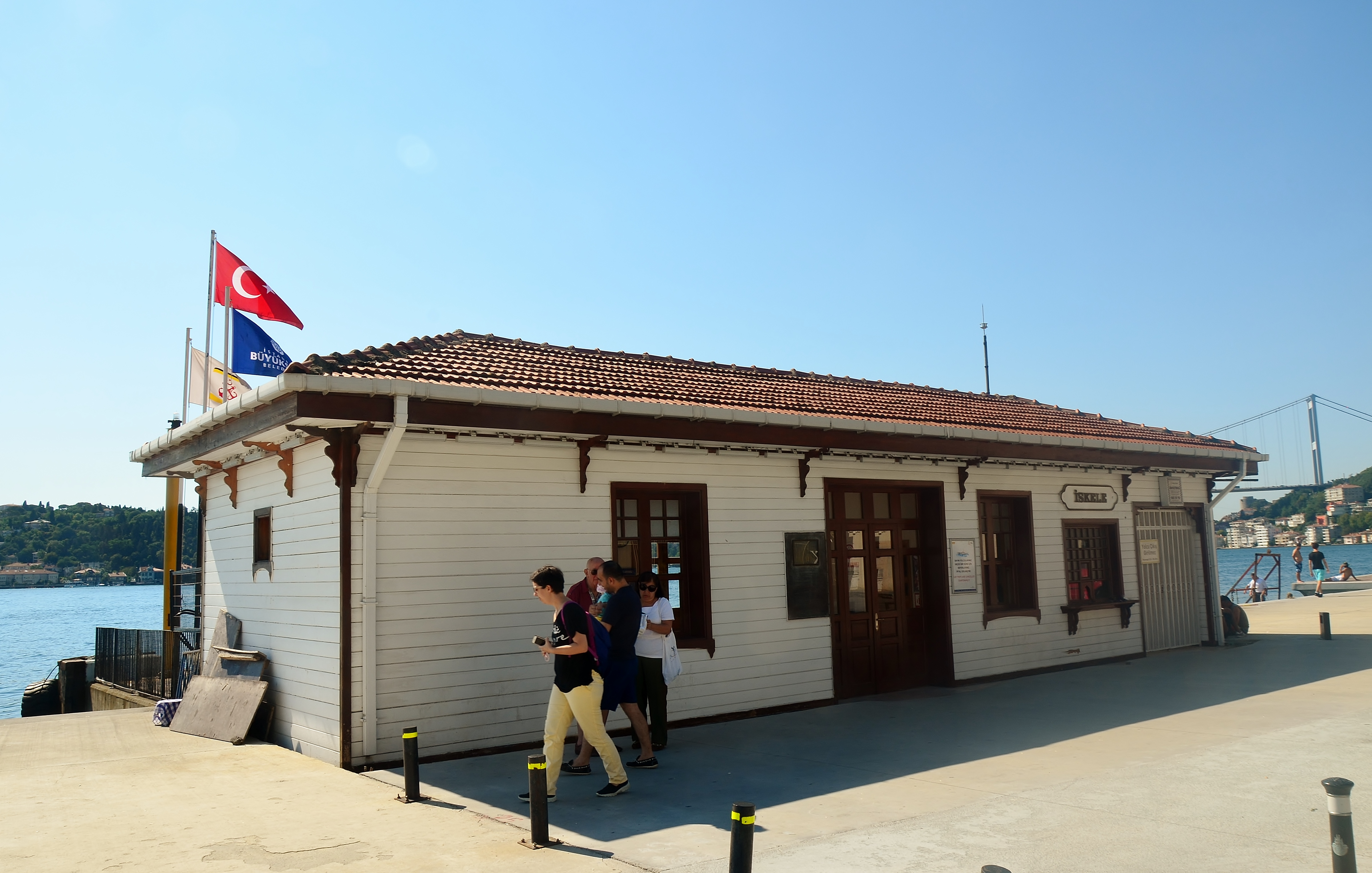
- Emirgan Pier in 2016.
- Coordinates: 41.10303°N 29.05607°E
- Carries: Pedestrians
- Locale: Emirgan, Sarıyer, Istanbul, Turkey
- Owner: Ferries in Istanbul (Şehir Hatları)

Characteristics
- Design: Pier
- Total length: 16.11 m (52.9 ft)

History
- Opened: 1851

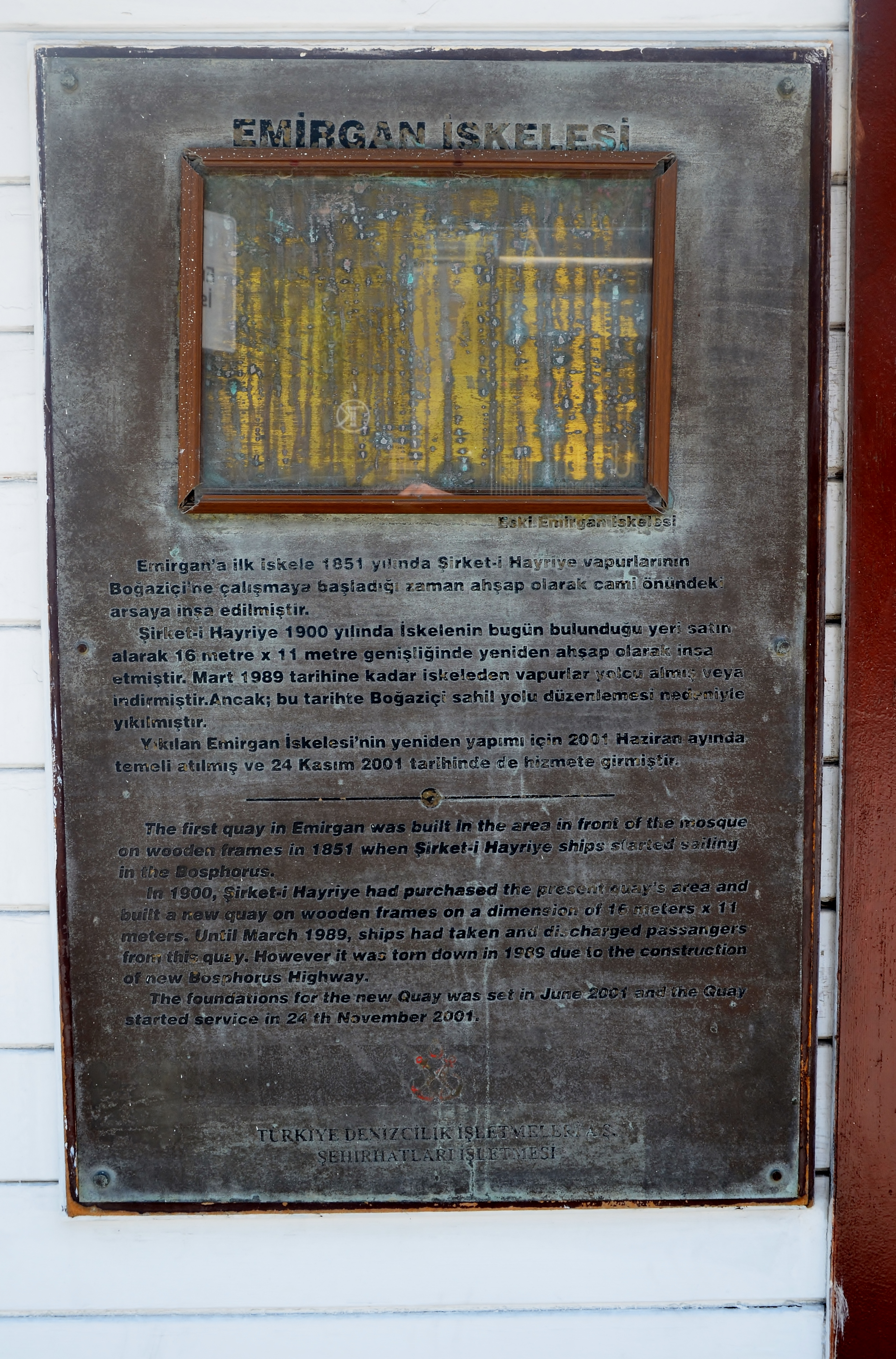
Inscription attached on the pier about the pier's history.

Emirgan Pier (Turkish: Emirgan İskelesi) is a historic passenger ferryboat pier located in Emirgan neighborhood of Sarıyer district in Istanbul Province, Turkey. It serves ferries in Istanbul running between Çengelköy and İstinye on Bosphorus.

The pier went into service in 1851 as the biggest of the piers on Bosphorus. The pier, which was situated at that time in front of the Emirgan Mosque, underwent essential repairs in 1897. In 1900, a new pier was built a little bit south of it by the new owner of the ferryboat line, the Ottoman company "Şirket-i Hayriye", and the original pier was removed. Even though the pier was called sometimes "Mirgün Pier" and then "Uluköy Pier", it held its current name.

The pier was closed down in March 1989, and demolished remaining inaccessible for 12 years during the widening works of the Bosphorus coastal street. After construction of a new pier building again in wood on piles that began in June 2001, it was reopened on November 24, 2001.

Emirgan Pier is 16.11 m (52.9 ft) long. It is 1.20 m (3.9 ft) above sea level. The water depth at the site is 7.70 m (25.3 ft).
