= Boradion =

Coastal town of ancient Bithynia

Coordinates: 41°06′08″N 29°04′04″E

Boradion was a coastal town of ancient Bithynia located on the Bosphorus.

Its site is located above Kanlıca in Asiatic Turkey.
