= Emirgan =

- Neighbourhood
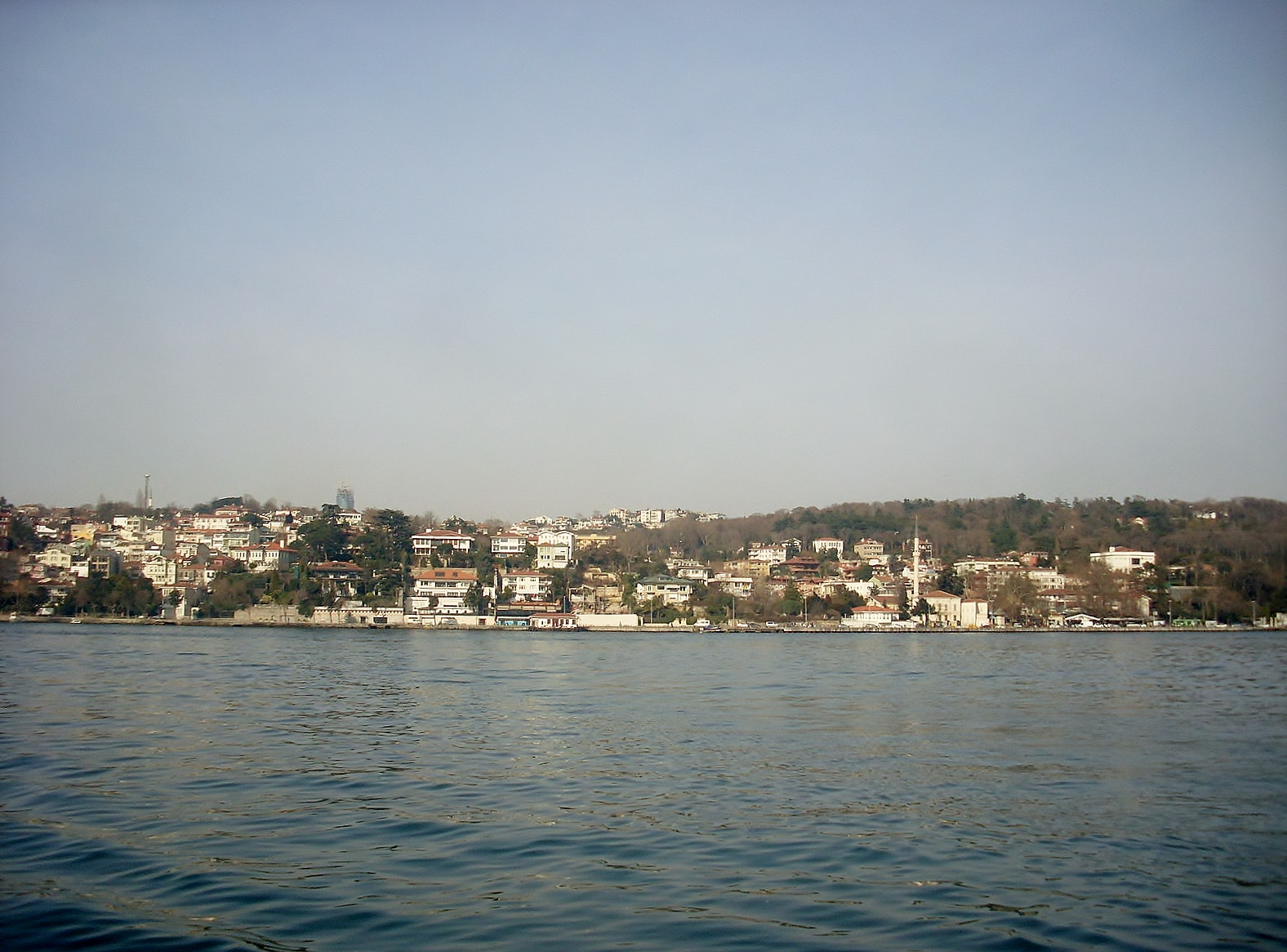
- Emirgan seen from the Bosphorus.

- Location within Turkey Location within Istanbul
- Coordinates: 41°06′11″N 29°03′20″E
- Country: Turkey
- Province: Istanbul
- District: Sarıyer
- Population (2024): 8,052
- Time zone: UTC+3 (TRT)
- Postal code: 34467
- Area code: 0212

Emirgan is a neighbourhood in the municipality and district of Sarıyer, Istanbul Province, Turkey. Its population is 8,052 (2024). It is a leafy, middle-class suburb of Istanbul, on the western shore of the Bosphorus north of the Fatih Sultan Mehmet Bridge (Second Bosphorus Bridge).

City bus lines 22, 22RE, 25E, 40T and 42T stop in Emirgan. Infrequent Şehir Hatları ferries connect Emirgan with Eminönü, Beşiktaş, Arnavutköy, Bebek, İstinye, Büyükdere, Sarıyer and Rumeli Kavağı. A separate ferry service links it to Çengelköy, Kandilli, Anadolu Hisarı and Kanlıca. Small private boats also travel back and forth between Emirgan and Kanlıca depending on demand.

== Etymology ==
The neighborhood is named after Emir Güne Han. In 1635 the Iranian Emir Güne Han surrendered Yerevan to Sultan Murad IV in return for which the sultan took him to Istanbul, renamed him Yusuf Paşa and gave him 50 hectares of woodland that is now the Emirgan Park. Once Murad died his successor Sultan Ibrahim the Mad had Yusuf put to death. Later Sultan Abdülaziz gave the woods to the Khedive of Egypt, Ismail Paşa, who added three pavilions to the grounds.

== Attractions ==
A string of popular tea gardens cluster round the main square and run along the coast road.

=== Emirgan Park ===
Emirgan Woods (Turkish: Emirgan Korusu) rise above the suburb and cover an area of around 500,000 square metres of what is now public park. The park is at its best in April during the annual Istanbul Tulip Festival when thousands of bulbs come into colourful flower here. The three pavilions created by Khedive İsmail Paşa - the Yellow (Sarı), Pink (Pembe) and White (Beyaz) kiosks - now serve as cafes and restaurants for visitors. The Yellow Pavilion was designed by the Turkish-Armenian architect Sarkis Balyan in the 1870s.

=== Sakıp Sabancı Museum ===
Overlooking the Bosphorus in peaceful and beautiful gardens, this private museum contains permanent collections of calligraphy, antique furniture and fine art which are regularly supplemented with short-term exhibitions showcasing everyone from Pablo Picasso through to Abdülmecid Efend, the artistic last caliph of the Ottoman Empire.

=== Şerifler Waterside Mansion ===
The Şerifler Yalı stands on the inland side of the coast road as you come into Emirgan from the centre of town; before the road was built in 1940 it would have stood right beside the water like so many of the yalıs (waterside mansions). Built sometime during the 18th century, it is the oldest surviving yalı on the European side of the Bosphorus and belonged at one time to Hüseyin, the Şerif of Mecca. The yalı probably stands on the site of a 17th-century mansion built for Emir Güne Han after whom the suburb was named. It now serves as offices for several historical monument conservation bodies and the Historic Towns Union (Tarihi Kentler Birliği) but is not open to the public.

=== Emirgan Mosque ===
The waterside Hamid Evvel Mosque was built in 1838 beside what is now the plane-tree-shaded main square of Emirgan. Facing it across the square, the timekeeper's cottage, added in 1844, now serves as a cafe.

== Gallery ==
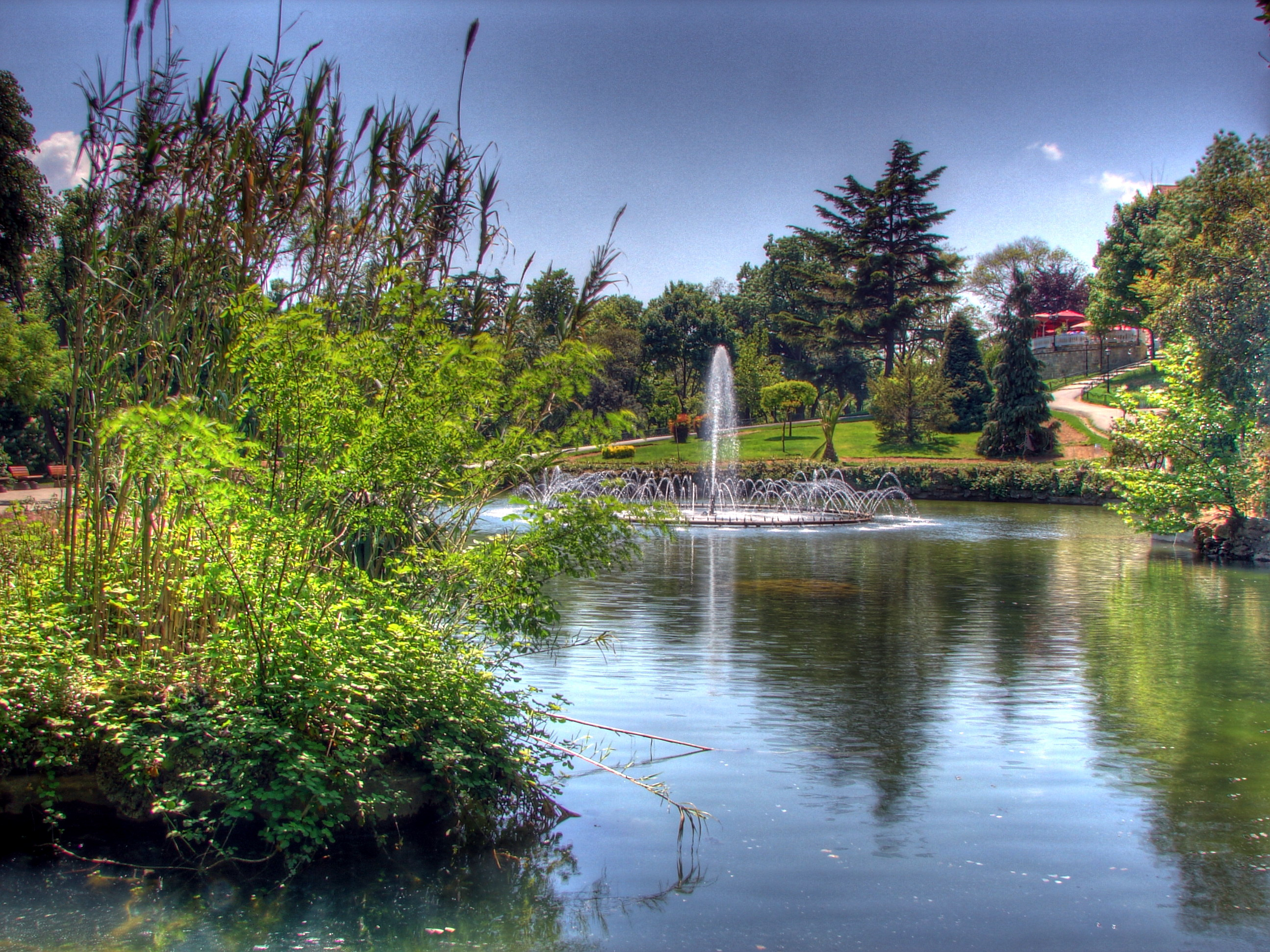
A view from Emirgan Park

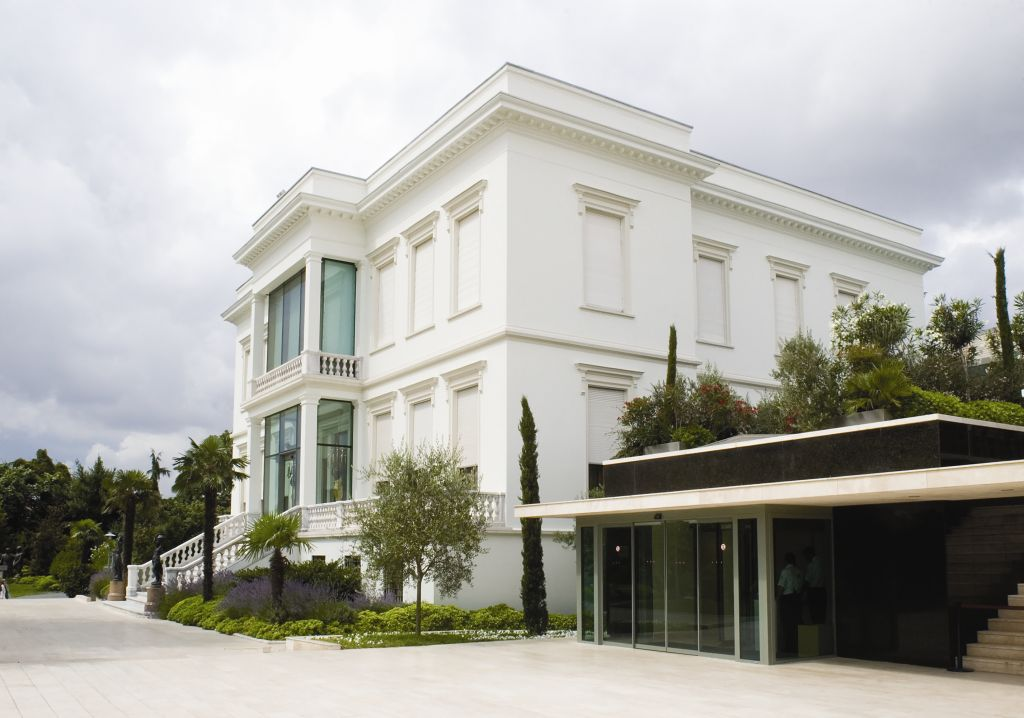
Main building of Sakıp Sabancı Museum

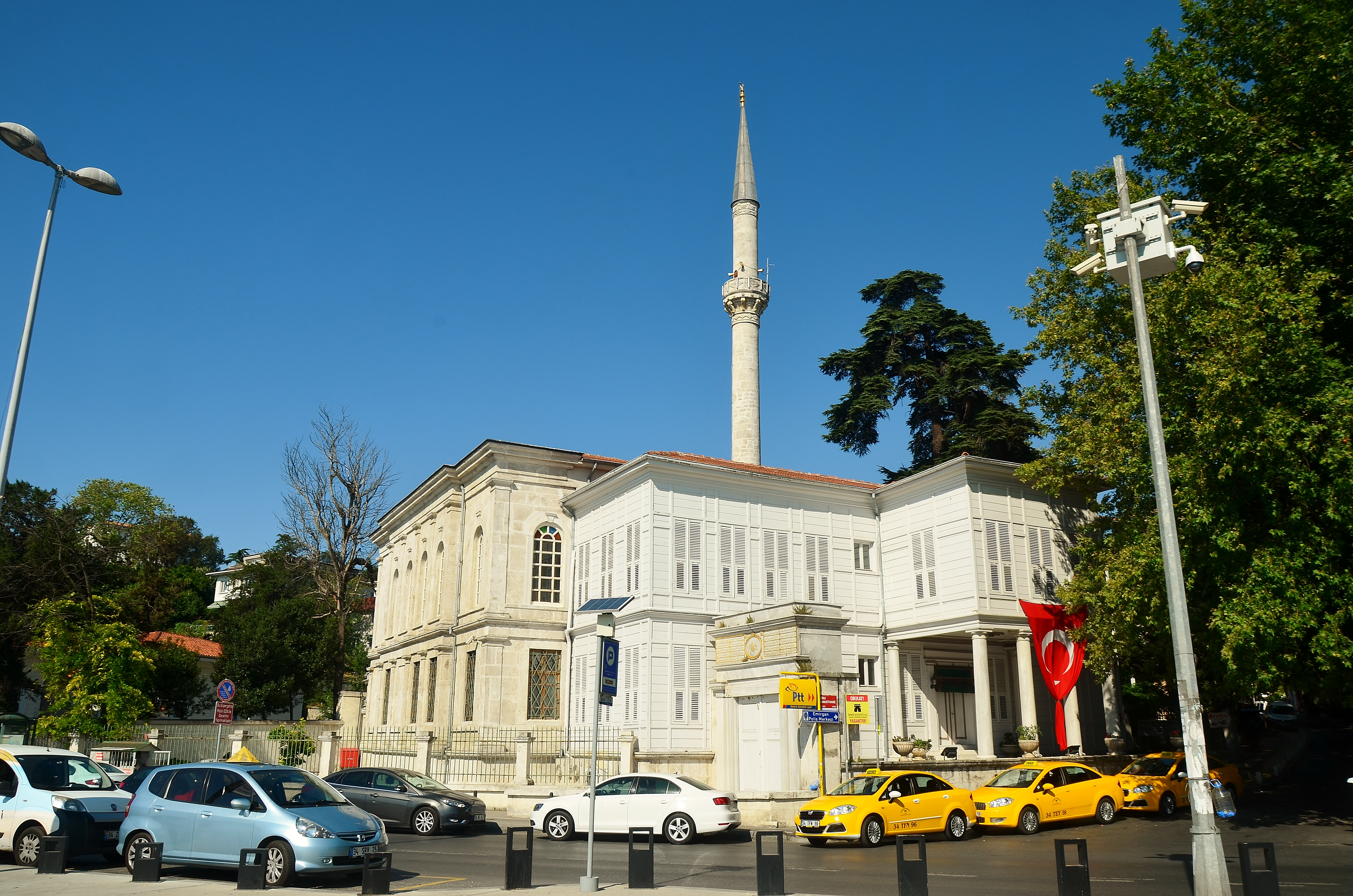
Emirgan Mosque

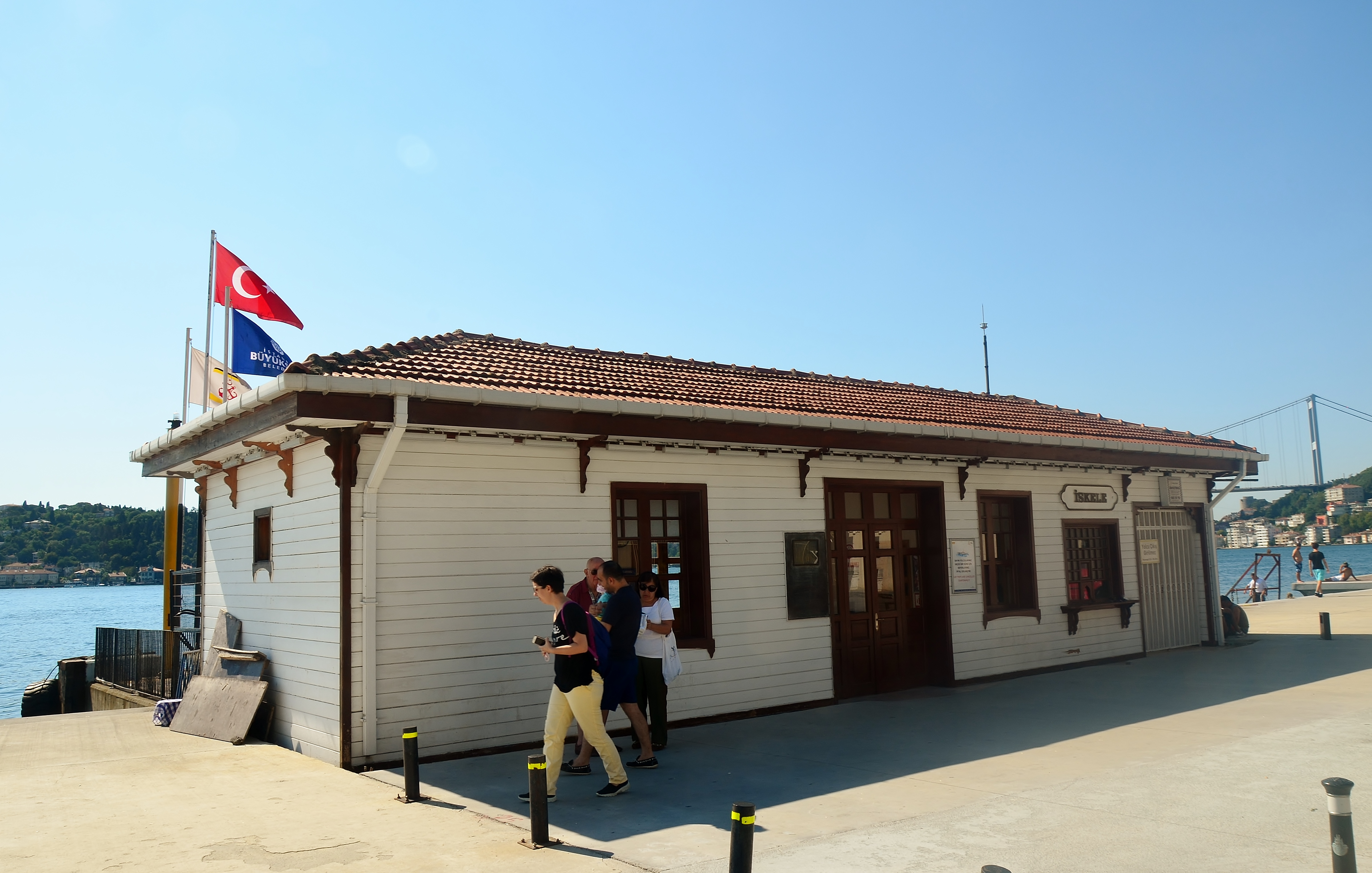
Emirgan Pier for city passenger ferryboats

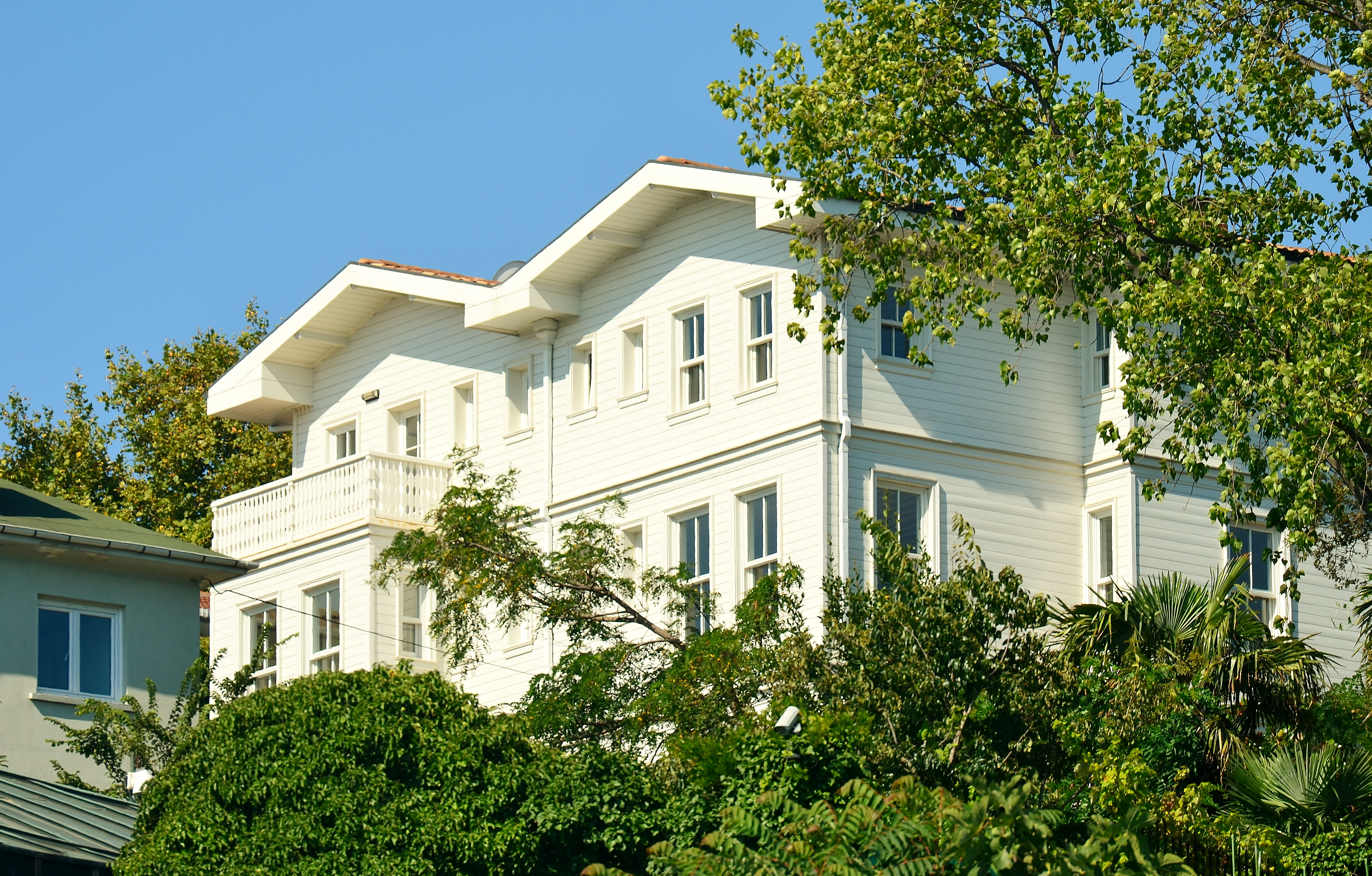
Historic wooden house in Emirgan

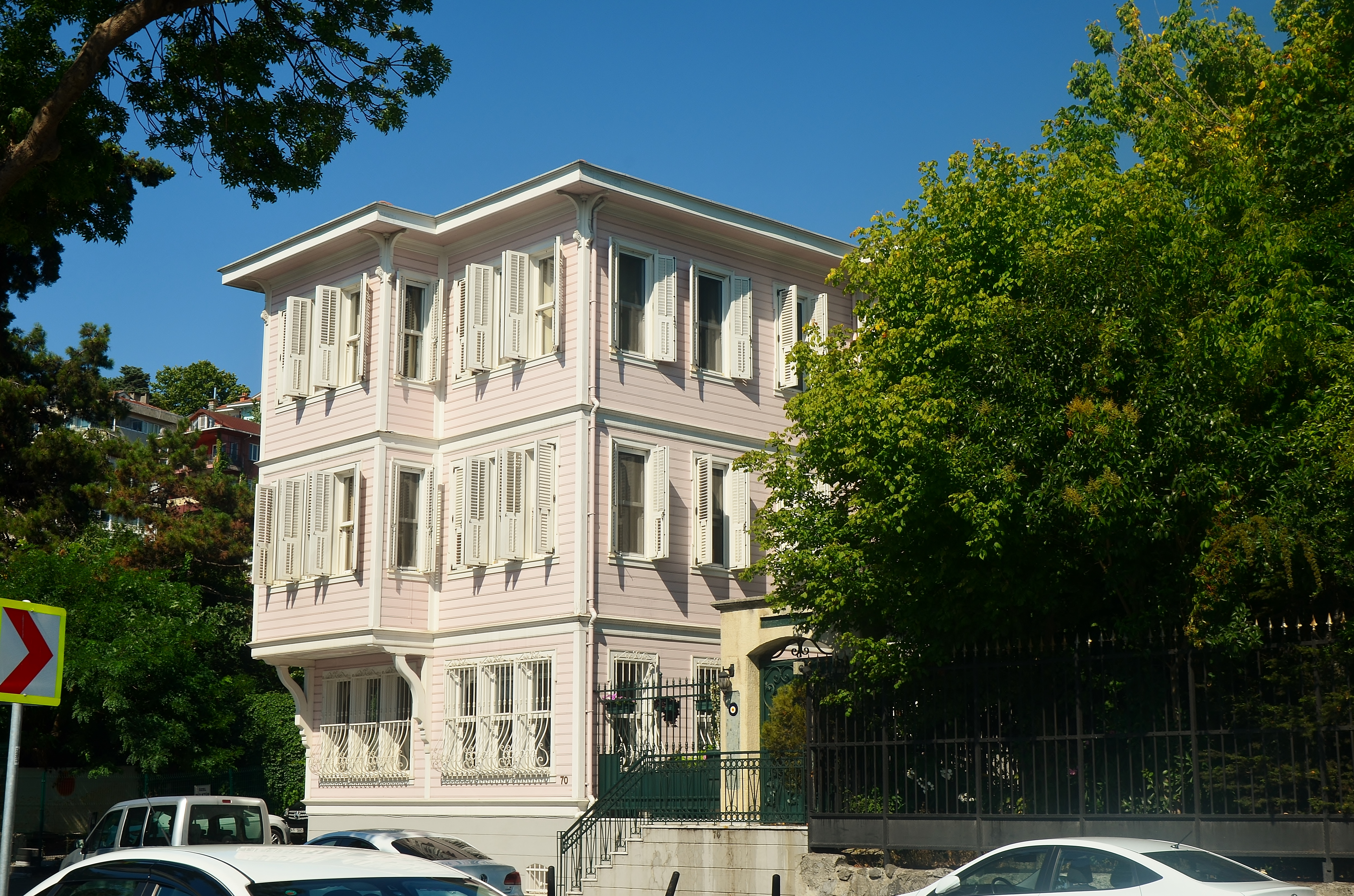
Historic wooden house in Emirgan
