= İskender Pasha Mosque, Kanlıca =

Mosque in Beykoz, Istanbul, Turkey

İskender Pasha Mosque
- İskender Paşa Cami
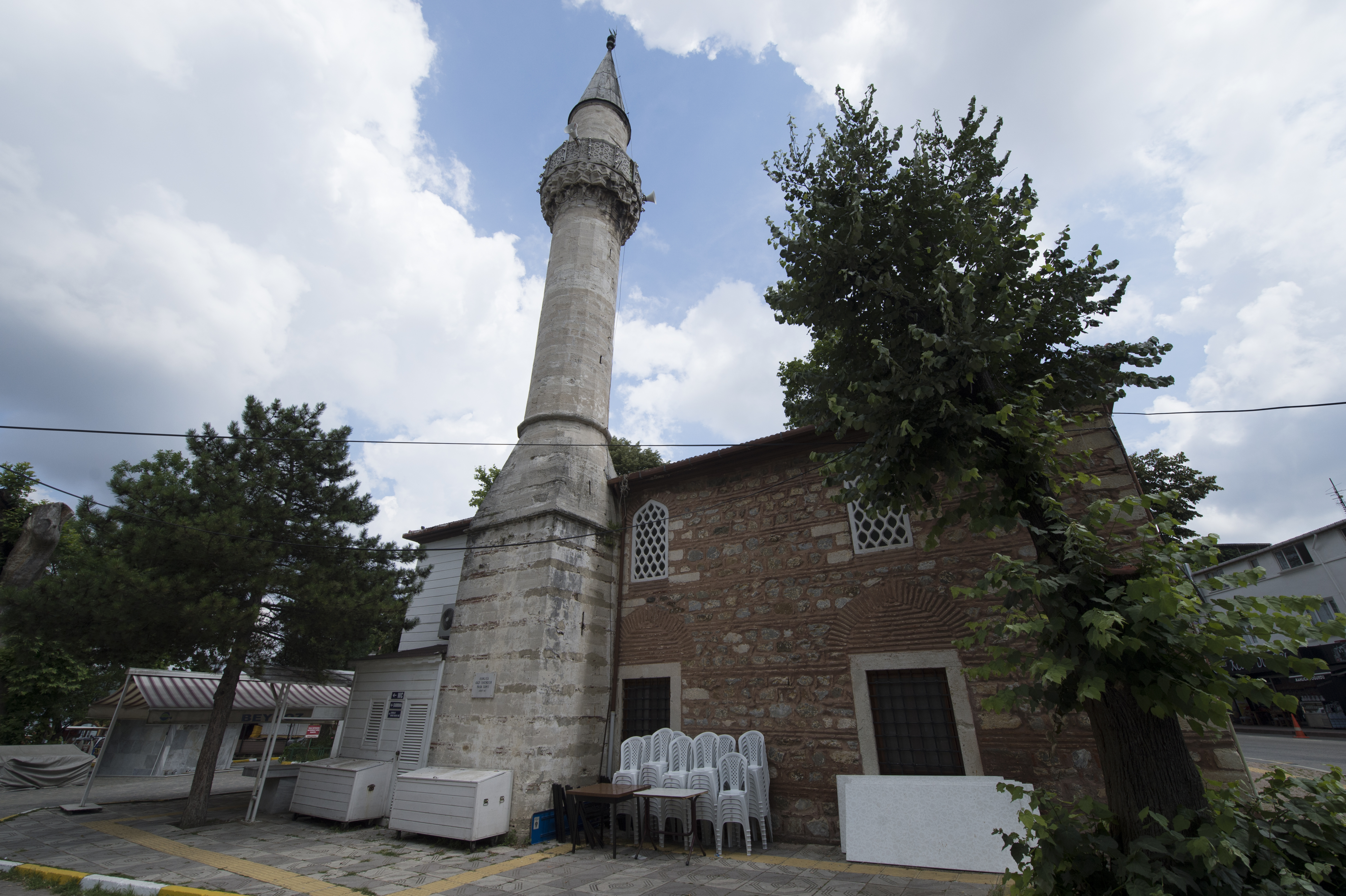

- Location in Istanbul

Religion
- Affiliation: Sunni Islam
- District: Beykoz
- Province: Istanbul

Location
- Location: Kanlıca
- Country: Turkey
- Coordinates: 41.10002°N 29.06587°E

Architecture
- Architect: Mimar Sinan
- Type: Mosque
- Completed: 1559–60

İskender Pasha Mosque (Turkish: İskender Paşa Cami) is a historic mosque located in the Kanlıca neighborhood of the Beykoz district of Istanbul, Turkey.

Located across the Kanlıca Pier, the mosque was commissioned by (military judge) Kazasker Gazi İskender Pasha and designed by the imperial architect Mimar Sinan in 1559–60. The mosque has a hipped roof and has been extensively rebuilt. The tomb of İskender Pasha is situated inside the mosque's courtyard.

== Gallery ==
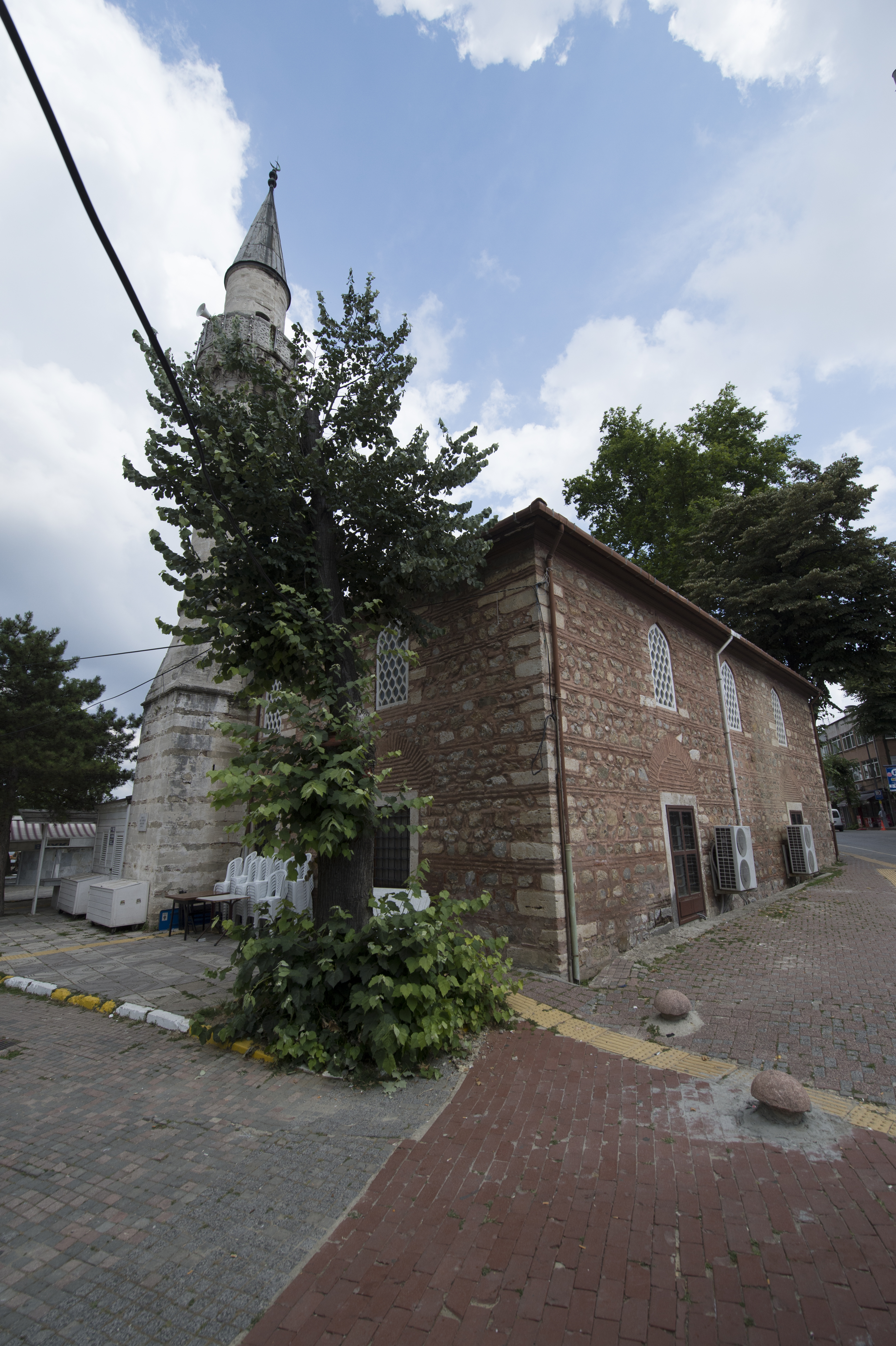
Gazi Iskender Pasha Camii exterior

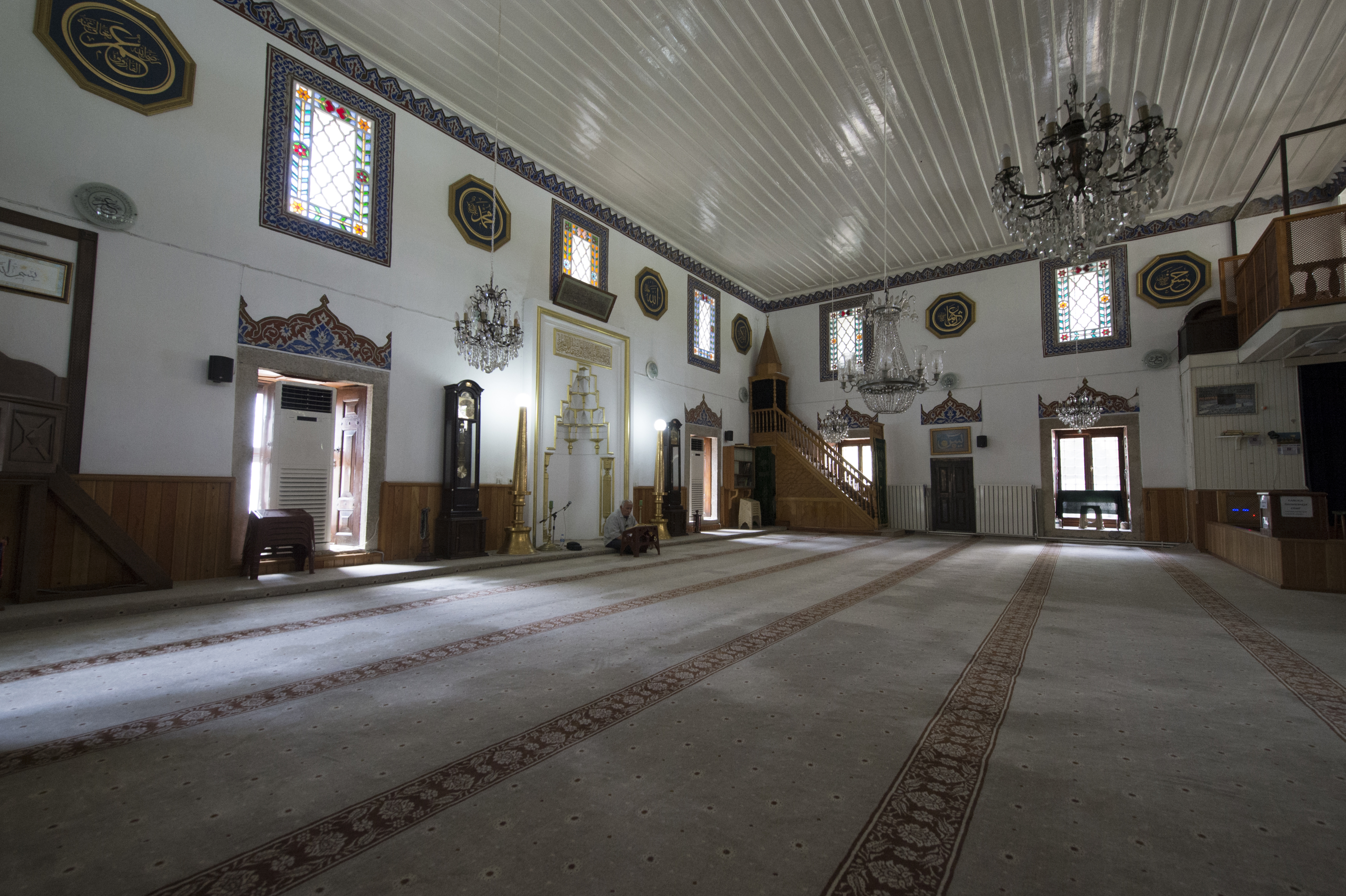
Gazi Iskender Pasha Camii interior

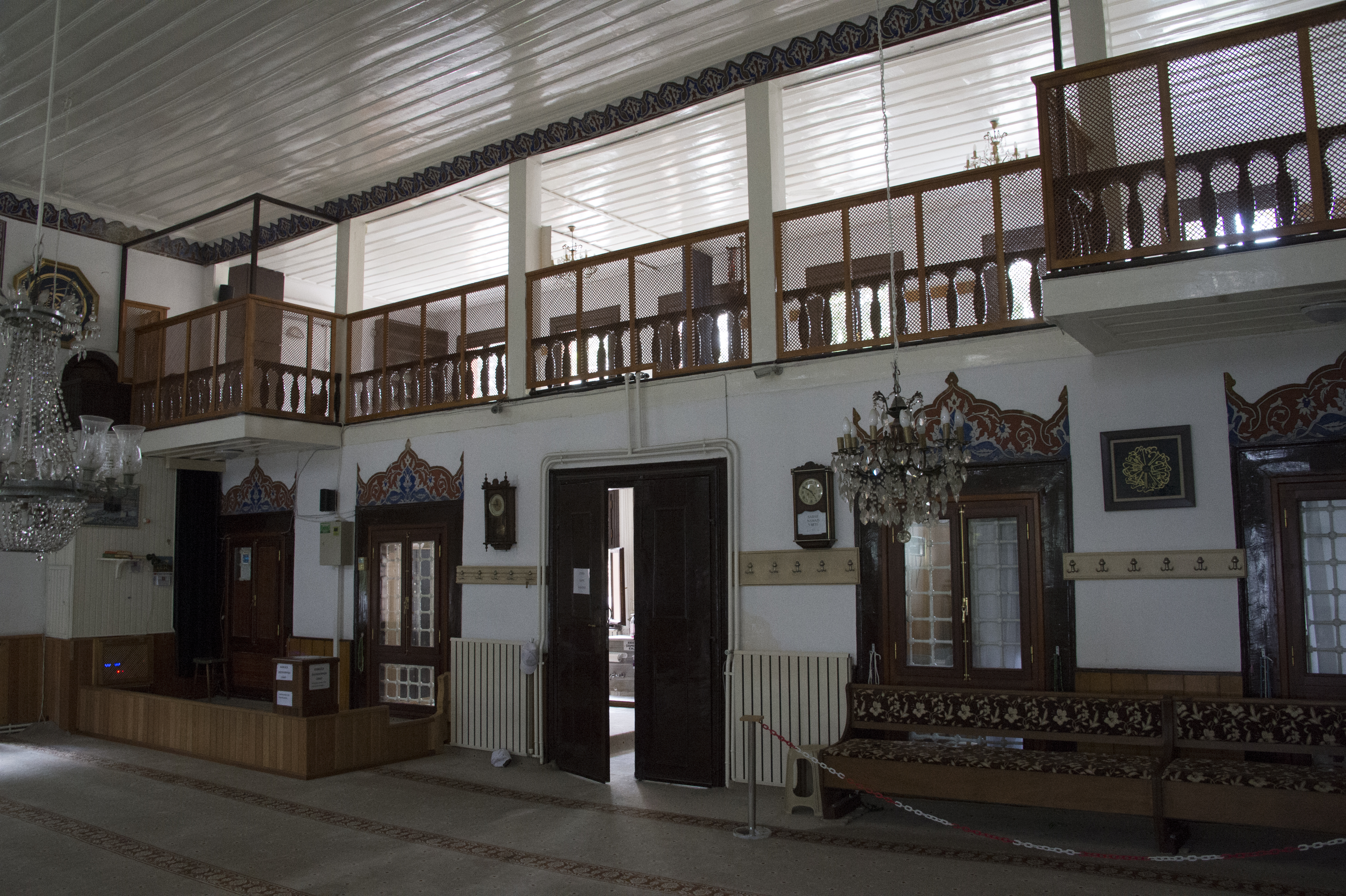
Gazi Iskender Pasha Camii balcony side

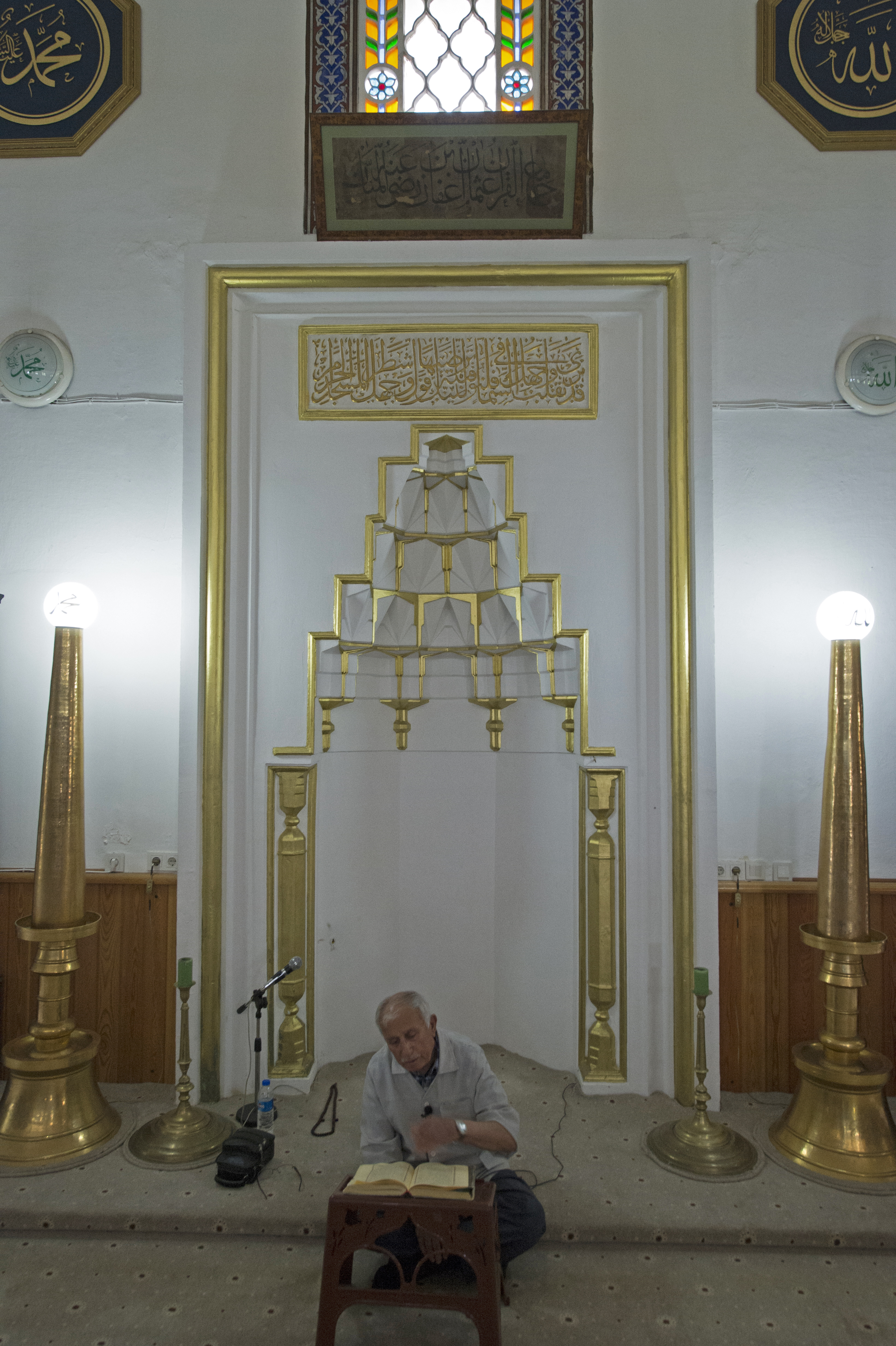
Gazi Iskender Pasha Camii mihrab

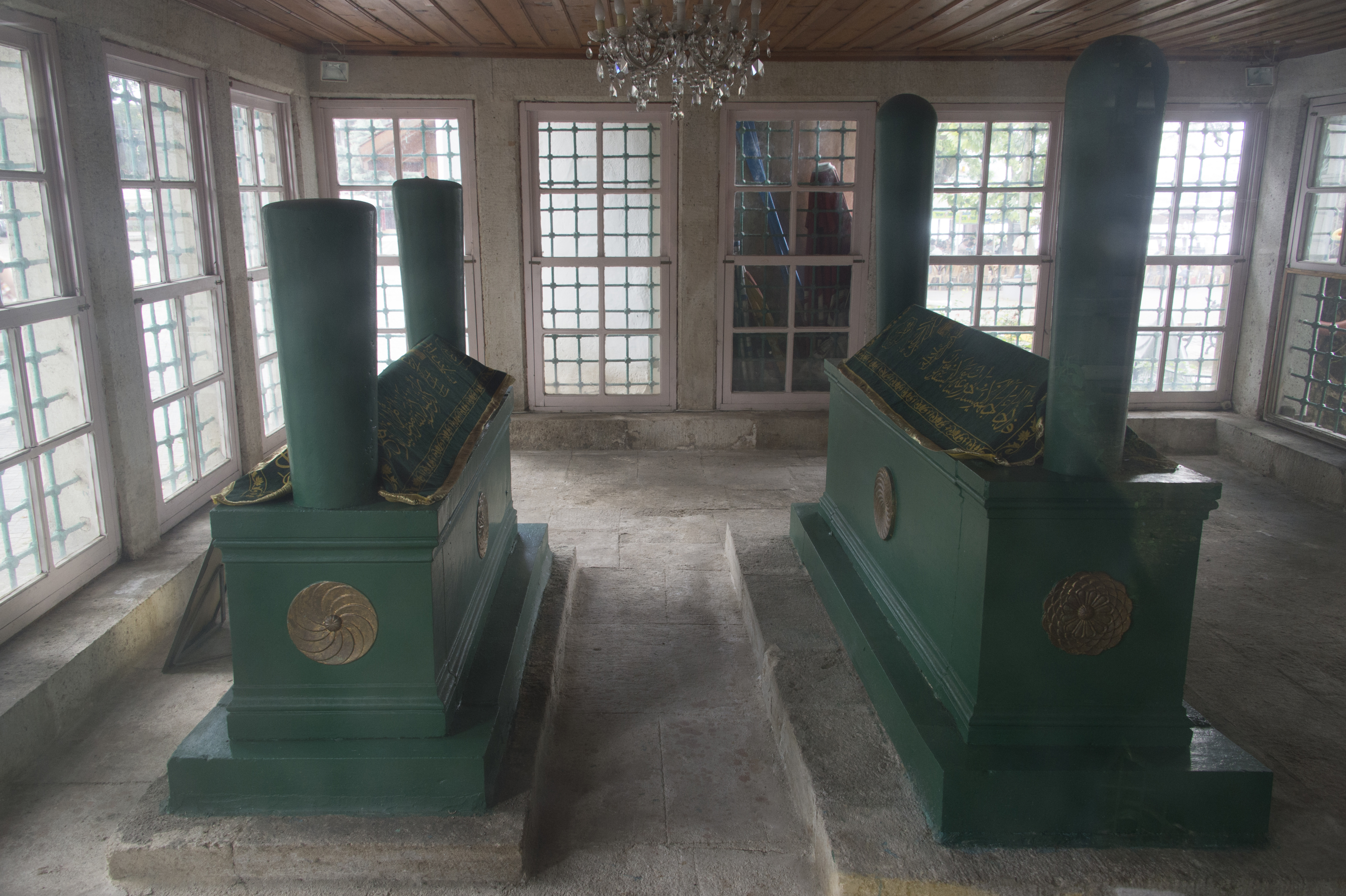
Gazi Iskender Pasha Camii mausoleum

== See also ==
- List of Friday mosques designed by Mimar Sinan

== Sources ==
- Necipoğlu, Gülru (2005). The Age of Sinan: Architectural Culture in the Ottoman Empire. London: Reaktion Books. ISBN 978-1-86189-253-9.
