= Mihrabat Nature Park =

Nature park in Beykoz, Istanbul, Turkey

- Mihrabat Tabiat Parkı
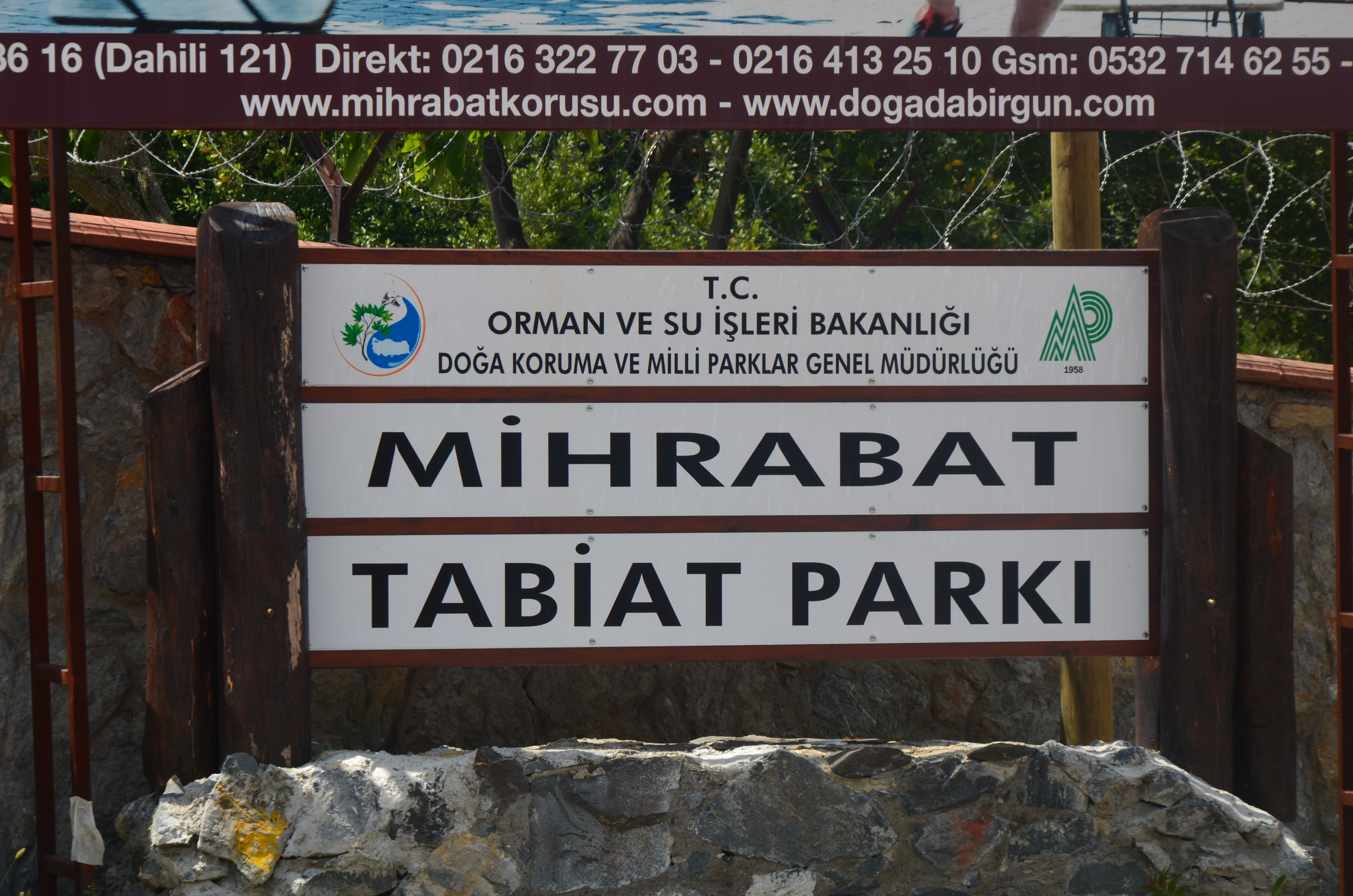
- Mihrabat Nature Park entrance.

- Location within Istanbul
- Location: Mihrabat Cad. 50, Kanlıca, Beykoz, Istanbul Province, Turkey
- Coordinates: 41°05′42″N 29°04′12″E
- Area: 20.12 ha (49.7 acres)
- Established: 2011

Mihrabat Nature Park (Turkish: Mihrabat Tabiat Parkı) is a nature park located on the Asian part in Beykoz district of Istanbul Province, Turkey.

Situated southeast of Kanlıca neighborhood of Beykoz next to the Bosphorus, it covers an area of 20.12 ha (49.7 acres). It was established in 2011.

The nature park offers outdoor recreational activities such as hiking, cycling and picnicing for visitors on daily basis. There are open-air basketball courts and football field. Access to the nature park is at Mihrabat Cad. 50. Admission is charged for visitors and vehicles. An open-air restaurant and a snack bar serve the visitors. Use of the nature park for events like weddings, music concerts and meetings is also permitted.

== Ecosystem ==
Flora

The nature park is the habitat for diverse species of plant with deciduous trees in the majority. Present deciduous vegetation include common hornbeam (Carpinus betulus), sweet chestnut (Castanea sativa), oriental plane (Platanus orientalis), silver linden (Tilia argentea), kermes oak (Quercus coccifera), Irish oak (Quercus petraea), Norway maple (Acer platanoides), Balkan maple (Acer trautvetteri), crepe flower (Lagerstroemia indica), Mediterranean hackberry (Celtis australis), cigartree (Catalpa bignonioides), Judas tree Cercis siliquastrum, common ash (Fraxinus excelsior), silver wattle (Acacia dealbata), cherry plum (Prunus cerasifera) and southern magnolia (Magnolia grandiflora).

Present conifer trees are stone pine (Pinus pinea), Himalayan cedar (Cedrus deodara) and Syrian juniper (Juniperus drupacea).

Foliage plants are Mediterranean cypress (Cupressus sempervirens), giant cedar (Thuja plicata), oriental cedar (Thuja orientalis), (Lebanon cedar (Cedrus libani) and Greek juniper (Juniperus excelsa).

Shrubs in the park are goat willow (Salix caprea), bay laurel (Laurus nobilis), Chinese photinia (Photinia serratifolia), laurestine (Viburnum tinus), strawberry tree (Arbutus unedo), English dogwood (Philadelphus coronarius), European holly (Ilex aquifolium), salt cedar (Tamarix), weaver's broom (Spartium junceum), scarlet firethorn (Pyracantha coccinea), blackberry (Rubus), Australian laurel (Pittosporum tobira), butcher's broom (Ruscus aculeatus), tree heath (Erica arborea), Japanese privet (Ligustrum japonicum), green olive tree (Phillyrea latifolia), dog-rose (Rosa canina) and common medlar (Mespilus germanica).

European ivy (Hedera helix) is found in the nature as creeper plant. On the hillsides, flowering plants such as stonecrops (Sedum hispanicum) and (Sedum spurium), oleander (Nerium oleander), rosemary (Rosmarinus officinalis) and nandina (Nandina domestica )).

Fauna

Observed bird species in the nature park are sparrow, dunnock, common raven, woodpecker and European goldfinch. Other animals found in the park are hare, squirrel, tortoise, and lizard.

== See also ==
- Emirgan Park
