= Emirgan Mosque =

Mosque in Sarıyer, Istanbul, Turkey

Emirgan Mosque (Emirgan Hamid-i Evvel Mosque)
- Emirgan Cami (Emirgan Hamid-i Evvel Cami)
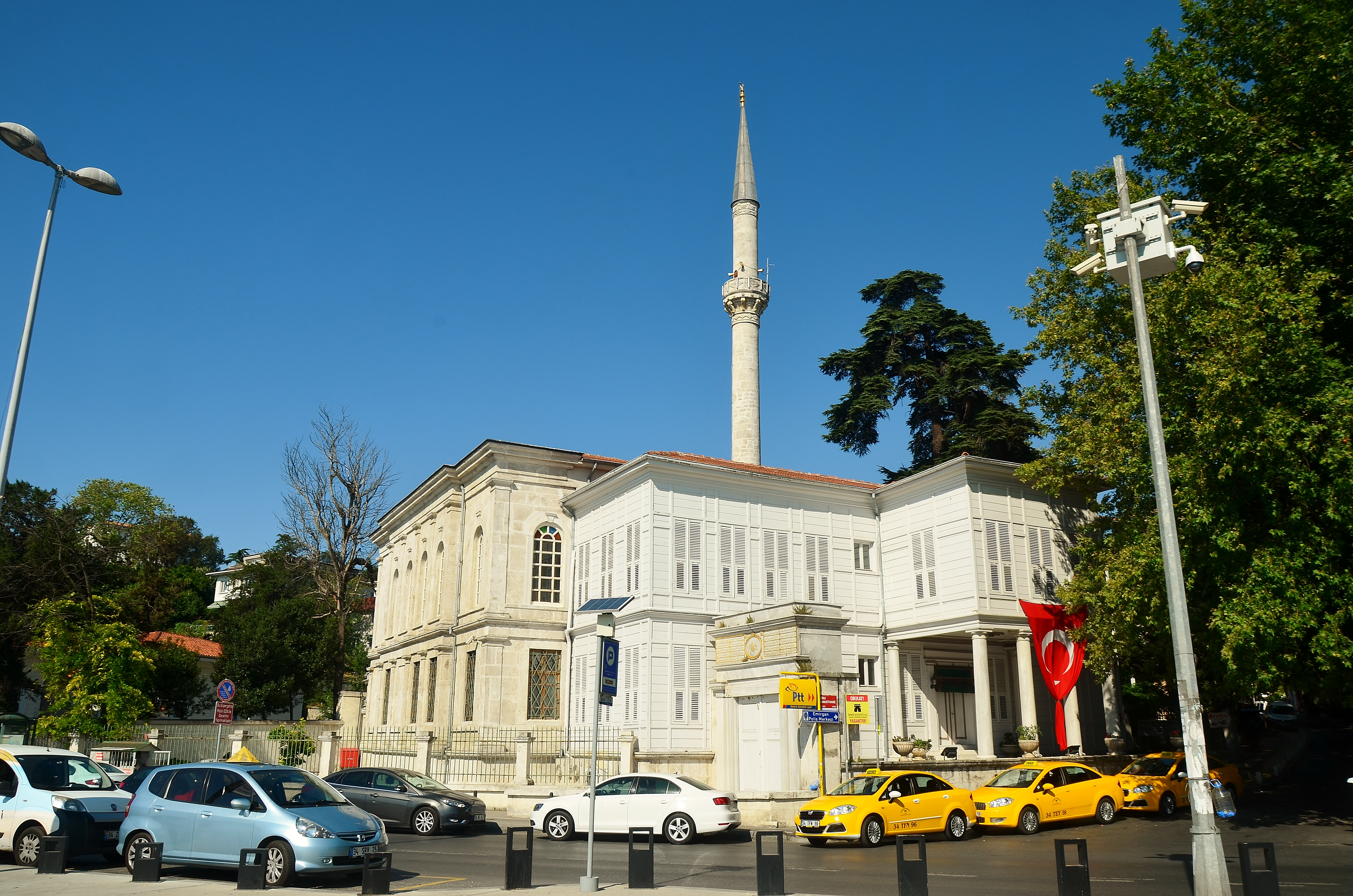

- Location of Emirgan Mosque in Istanbul

Religion
- Affiliation: Islam
- District: Sarıyer
- Province: Istanbul

Location
- Location: Sakıp Sabancı Cad. Emirgan
- Country: Turkey
- Coordinates: 41.10456°N 29.05626°E

Architecture
- Type: Mosque
- Style: Islamic, Ottoman architecture Empire Period (1808–1876)
- Completed: 1781

Specifications
- Minaret: 1
- Materials: Limestone ashlar

Emirgan Mosque (Turkish: Emirgan Cami), officially Emirgan Hamid-i Evvel Mosque (Ottoman Turkish: Emirgan Hamid-i Evvel Cami) is an 18th-century Ottoman mosque located in the Emirgan neighborhood of the Sarıyer district in Istanbul, Turkey.

The mosque was built in 1781 by Ottoman Sultan Abdul Hamid I (reigned 1774–1789) in memory of his early-died son Mehmed and the mother of his son Hümaşah Kadınefendi. The mosque is officially named after the sultan's name in Ottoman language. Originally, it was part of a complex consisting of a still-existing square fountain, and non-existent structures like a hamam (bathhouse), a bakery and a mill. The complex was constructed on the place of a former coastal palace owned by Emirgüneoğlu Yusuf Pasha. The current mosque was rebuilt by Sultan Mahmud II (r. 1808–1839), the son of Abdul Hamid I.

The architectural style details and the decorations of the mosque comply with the architecture of Empire Period (1808–1876) of the Mahmud II era rather than with the Baroque Period (1757–1808) architecture of the Abdul Hamid I era. Apparently, no part of the mosque building is original except the inscription dating the first construction by Abdul Hamid I in 1871, which is kept on place as a sign of respect.

The square-plan mosque was built in a courtyard in ashlar masonry with a wooden roof. The big windows in two rows on each side bring natural lighting into the mosque. A cylindrical slim minaret with one balcony erected on a square base is situated south of the mosque. The Acanthus-type foliage ornaments and other decorations on the minaret, typical of 19th-century minarets, indicate that it underwent modifications. A two-story sultan's pavilion is attached to the mosque's eastern wall with a separate entrance. A bay window, supported by six columns, served as relaxation room for the sultan. According to a two-line poetic inscription written in Thuluth on top of the shadirvan situated at the northern corner of the mosque's courtyard, it was endowed by Rebgigül Hanım, the head of female servants in the house of Mümtaz Kadın, a spouse of Wali and Khedive of Ottoman Egypt Kavalalı Mehmet Ali Pasha (r. 1805–1848).

== Gallery ==
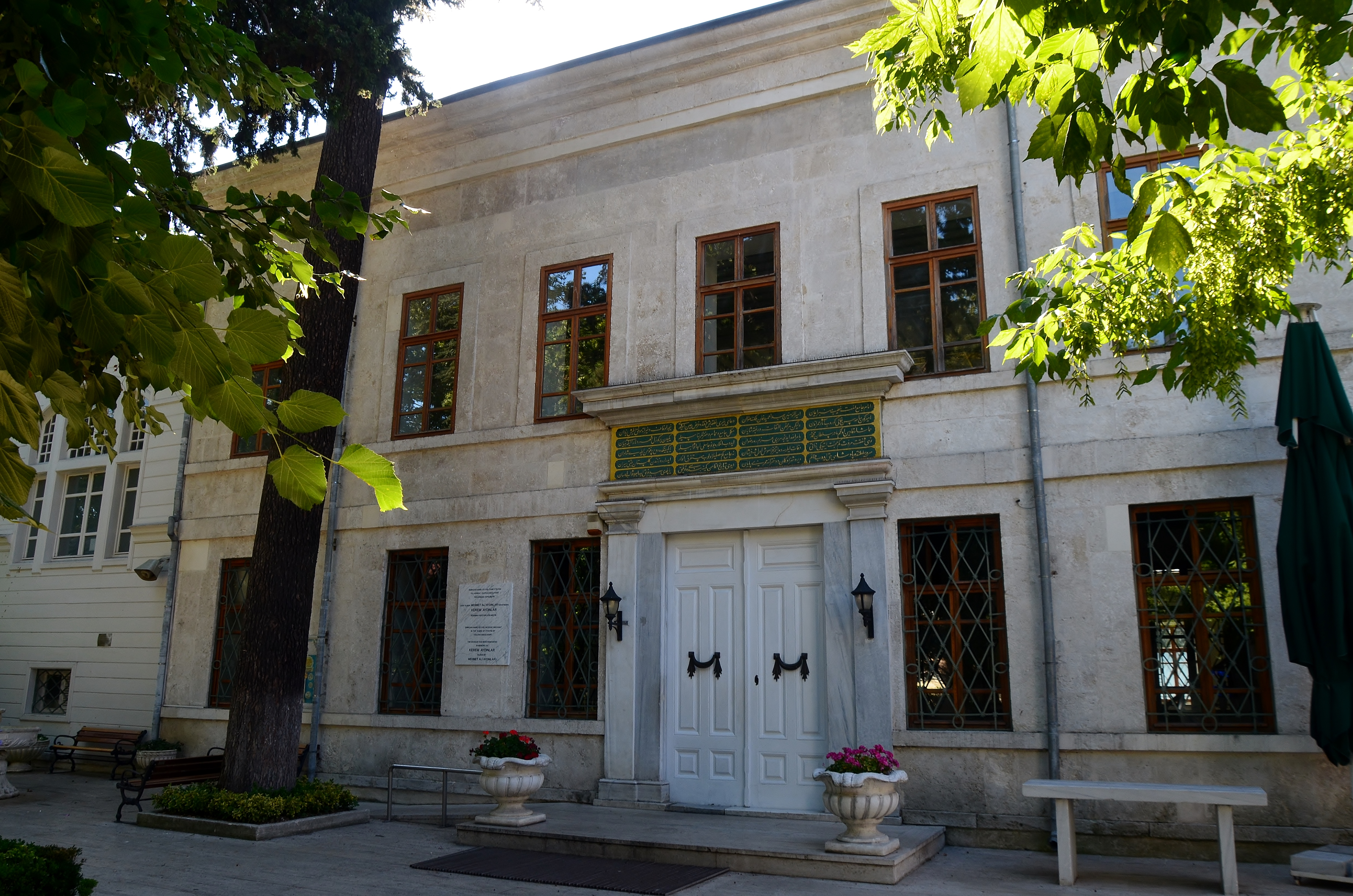
Northwestern façade and main entrance.

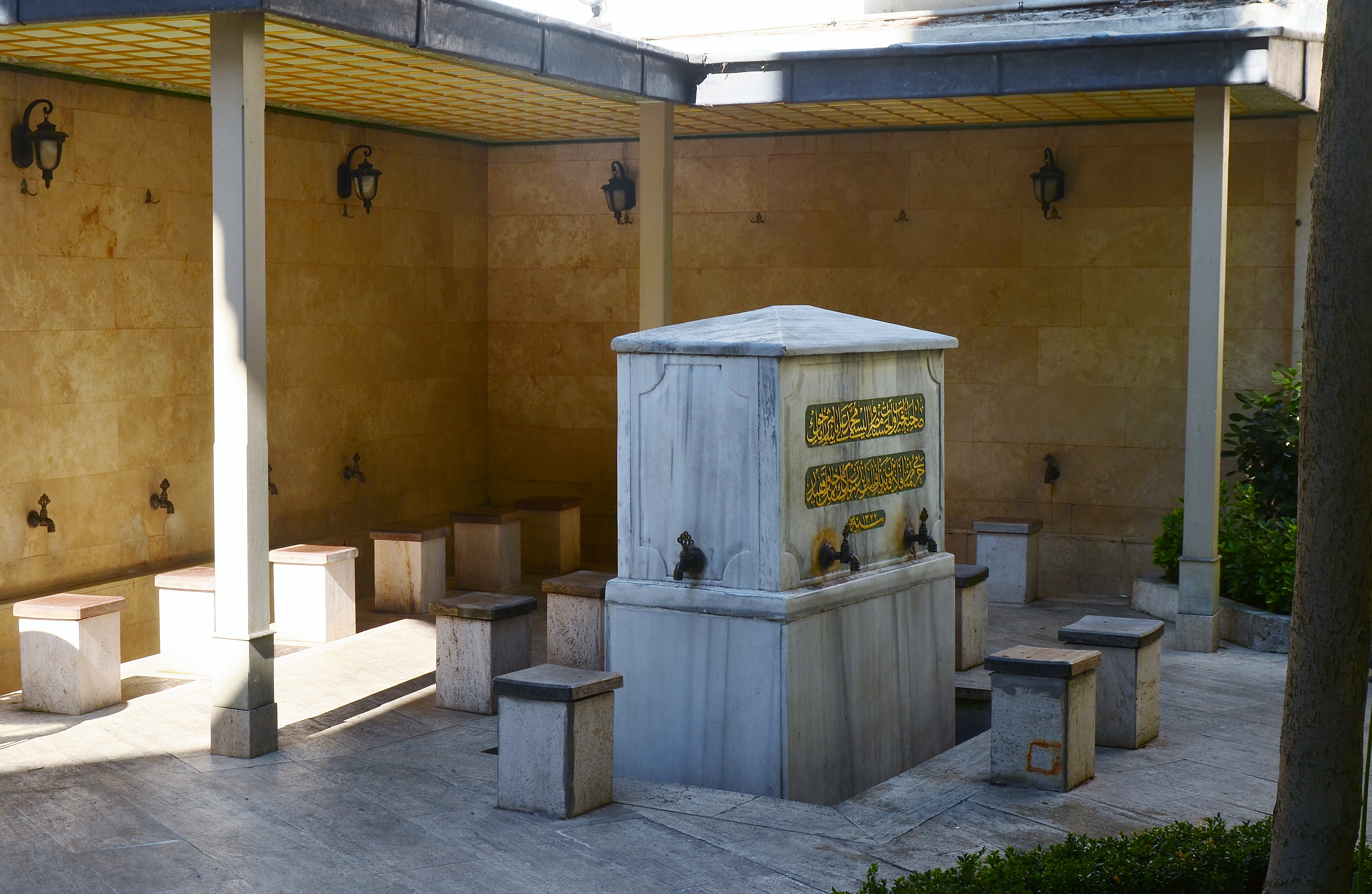
Shadirvan in the courtyard of the mosque.

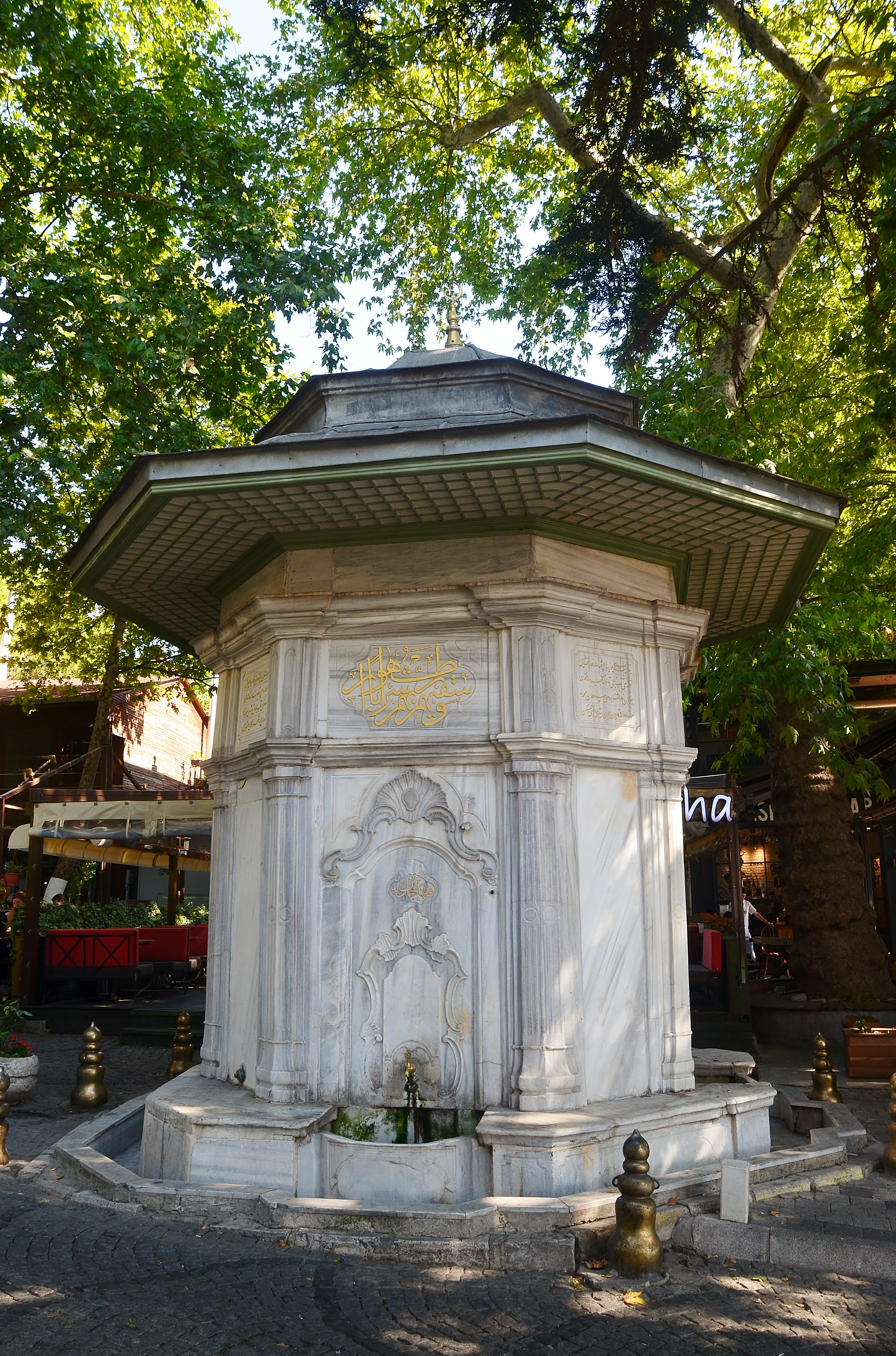
Square fountain as part of Emirgan Mosque.
