= Kanlıca =

- Neighbourhood
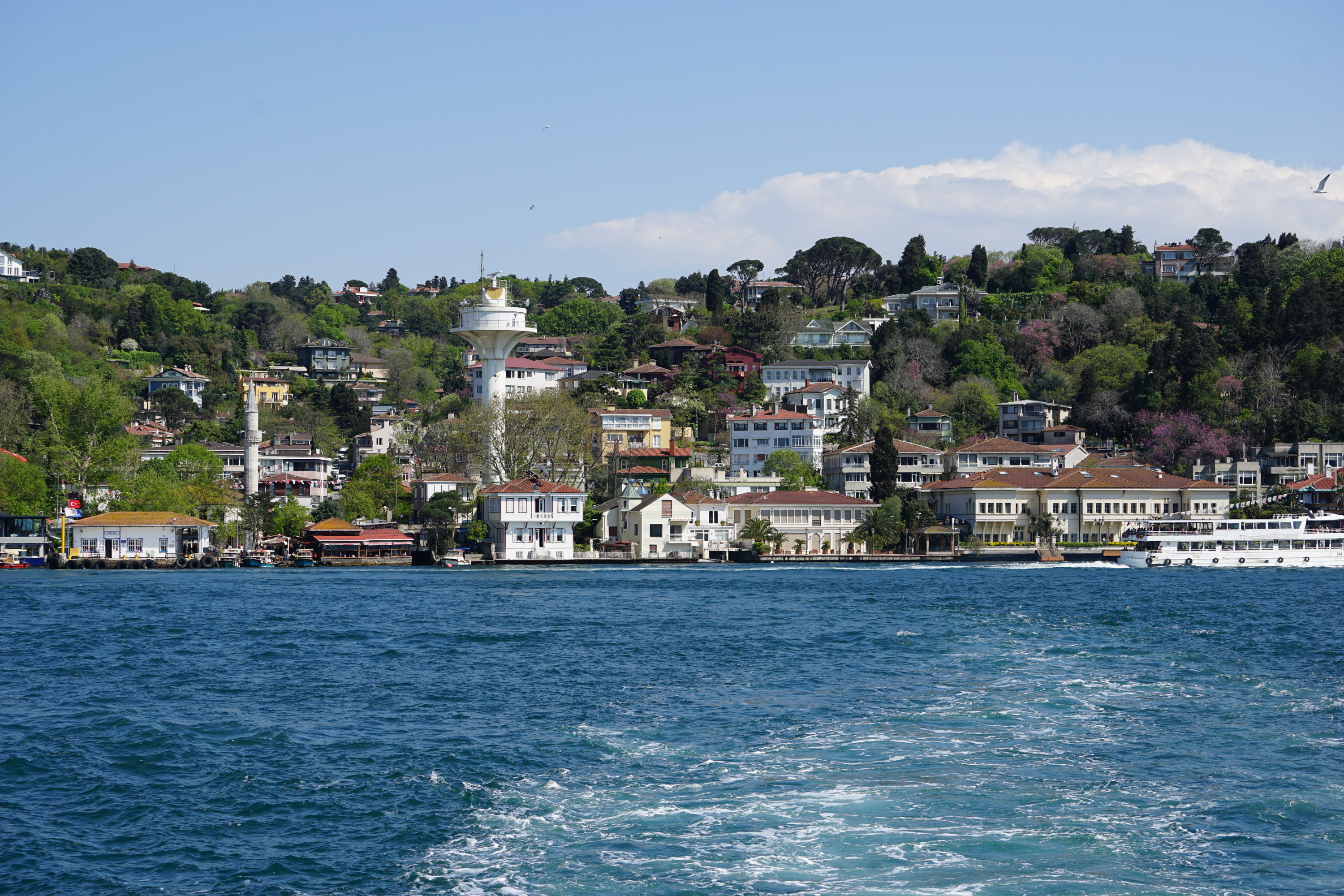
- A view of Kanlıca with the Bosphorus ferry pier to the left

- Location within Turkey Location within Istanbul
- Coordinates: 41°06′00″N 29°03′57″E
- Country: Turkey
- Province: Istanbul
- District: Beykoz
- Population (2025): 3,885
- Time zone: UTC+3 (TRT)
- Postal code: 34810
- Area code: 0216

Kanlıca is a neighbourhood in the municipality and district of Beykoz, Istanbul Province, Turkey. Its population is 3,885 (2025). It is on the Asian side of the Bosphorus strait. It is known for a yogurt sprinkled with caster sugar, which is sold in local cafés.

== Location ==
The Bülbül Creek empties into the Bosphorus at Kanlıca Bay. The Mihrabat Nature Park is situated south of Kanlıca, north of Bülbül Creek.

The İskender Pasha Mosque, commissioned by (military judge) Kazasker Gazi İskender Pasha and originally built by Mimar Sinan in 1559–60, is located inland from Kanlıca Pier. The tomb of İskender Pasha is attached to the old timekeeper's lodge.The mosque has since been rebuilt so that no trace of the Sinan work survives.

The Kanlıca Cemetery is on the hill east of the locality overlooking the Bosphorus. Notable burials of the cemetery include journalist Sedat Simavi, the musicians Barış Manço and Kayahan Açar.

Kanlıca Pier serves the City Ferry Lines (Turkish: Şehir Hatları) connecting it with Arnavutköy, Bebek, Emirgan, and İstinye on the European shore and Anadoluhisarı, Kandilli and Çengelköy on the Asian shore. Kanlıca Pier is the starting point for the annual Bosphorus Intercontinental Swim, a 6.5 km (4.0 mi)-long open water swimming event across the Strait that finishes at Kuruçeşme on the European side of the city.

A road running inland from Kanlıca Pier leads to the hilltop Khedive's Palace (Hıdiv Kasrı).

== History ==
During the Ottoman era, Kanlıca was an upscale neighbourhood, where wealthy people constructed elegant waterfront mansions (Turkish: Yalı). It is still home to many historic wooden waterfront mansions.

According to Ottoman estimations, in 1882 Kanlica had a population of 9,891, consisting of 6,095 Muslims, 3,043 Greeks, 708 Armenians, 41 Catholics and 4 Latins.

== Gallery ==
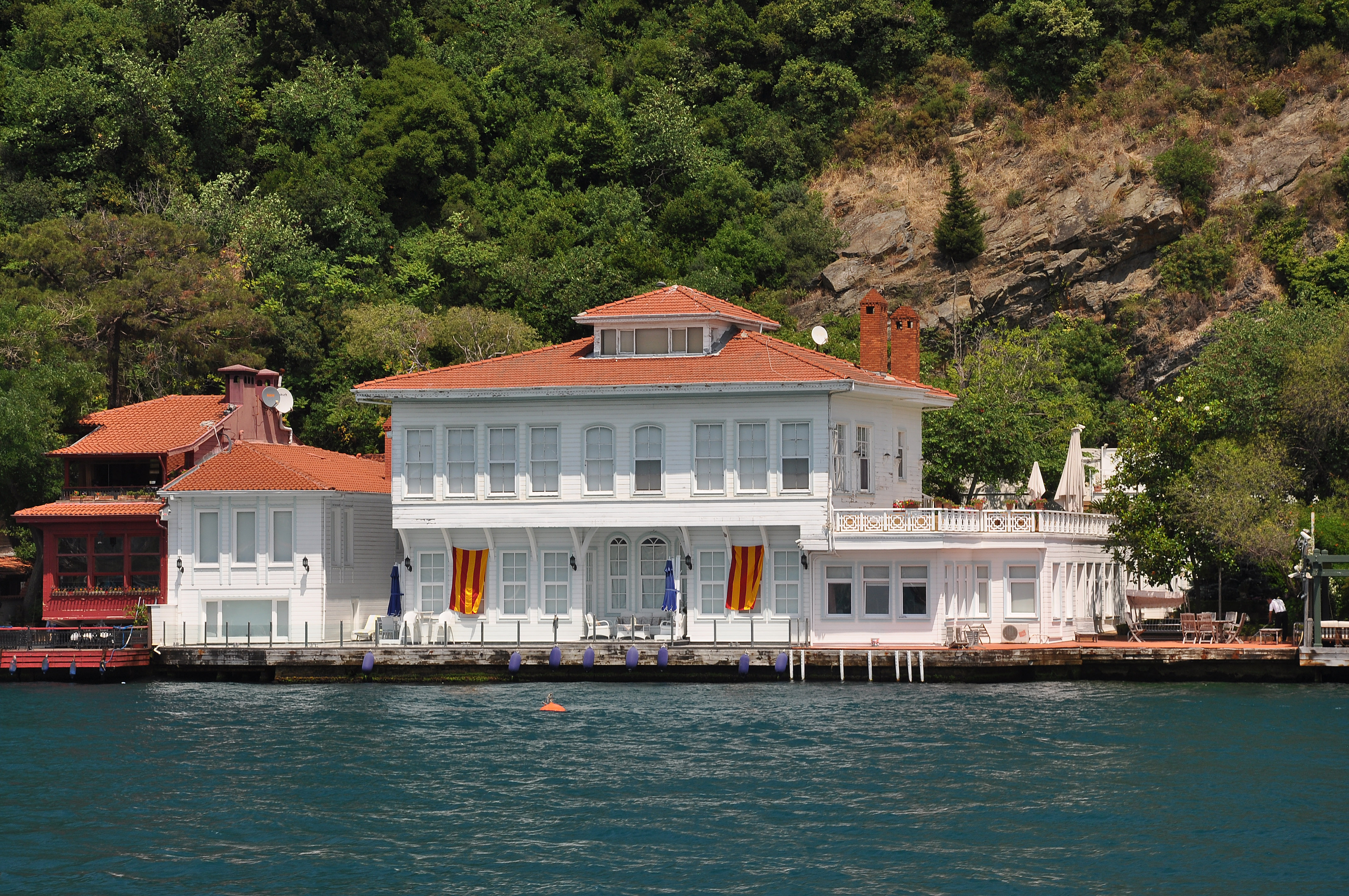
Yalı of (Grand vizier) Sadrazam Kadri Pasha

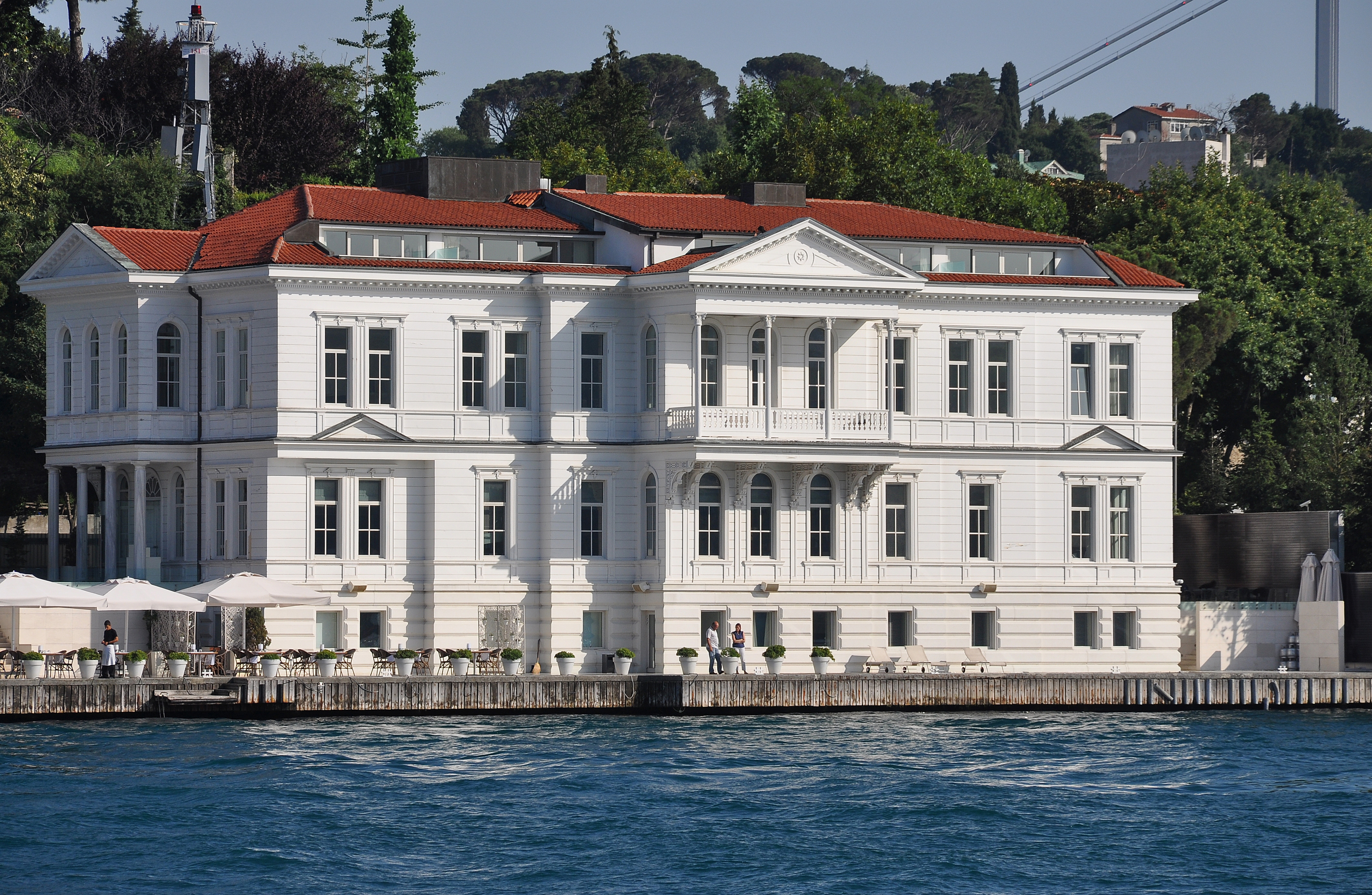
Yalı of Ahmet Rasim Pasha

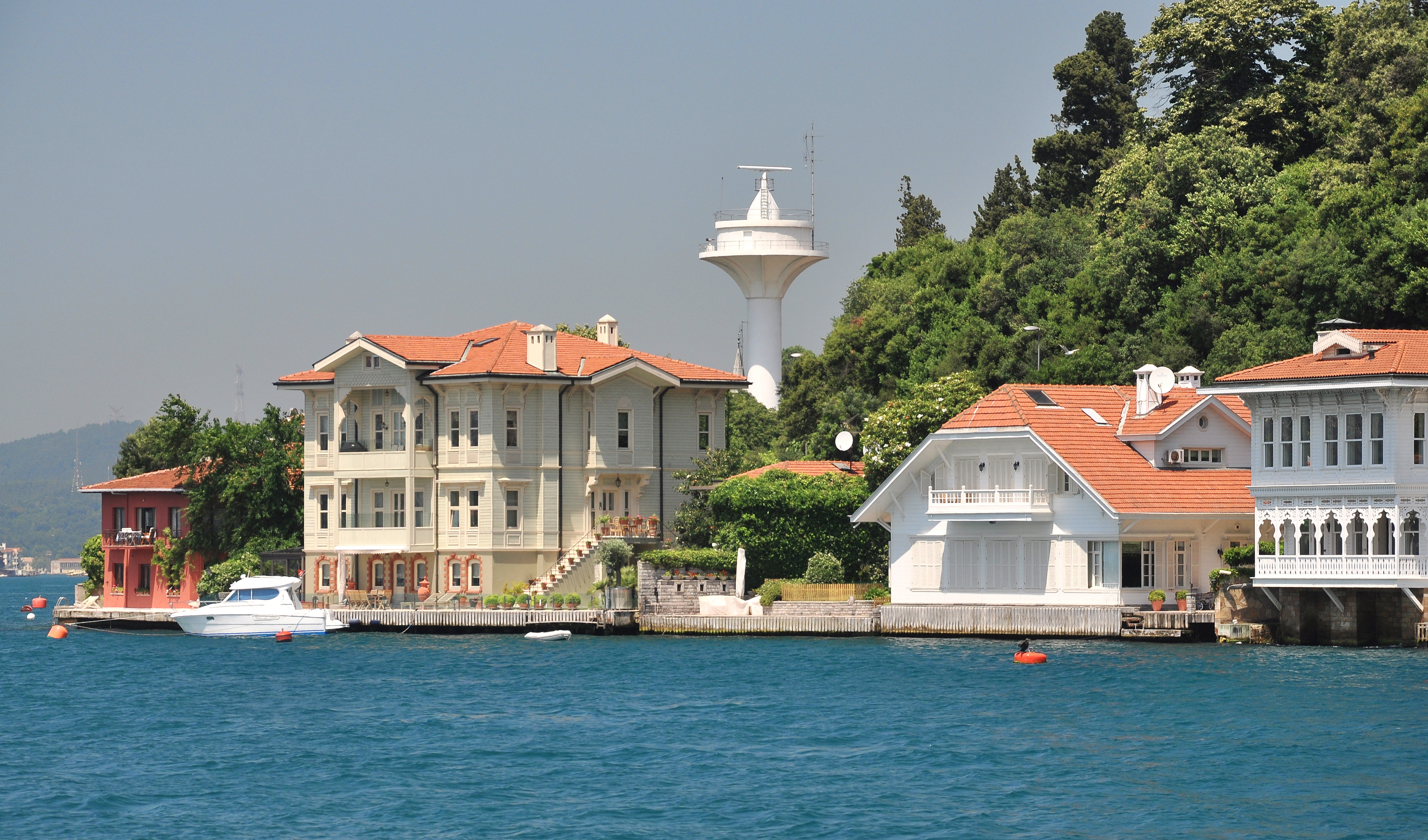
Yalı of Hacı Ahmet Bey (second left), Yalı of Ali Mazhar Bey (right), Ethem Pertev Bey Yalısı (rightmost)

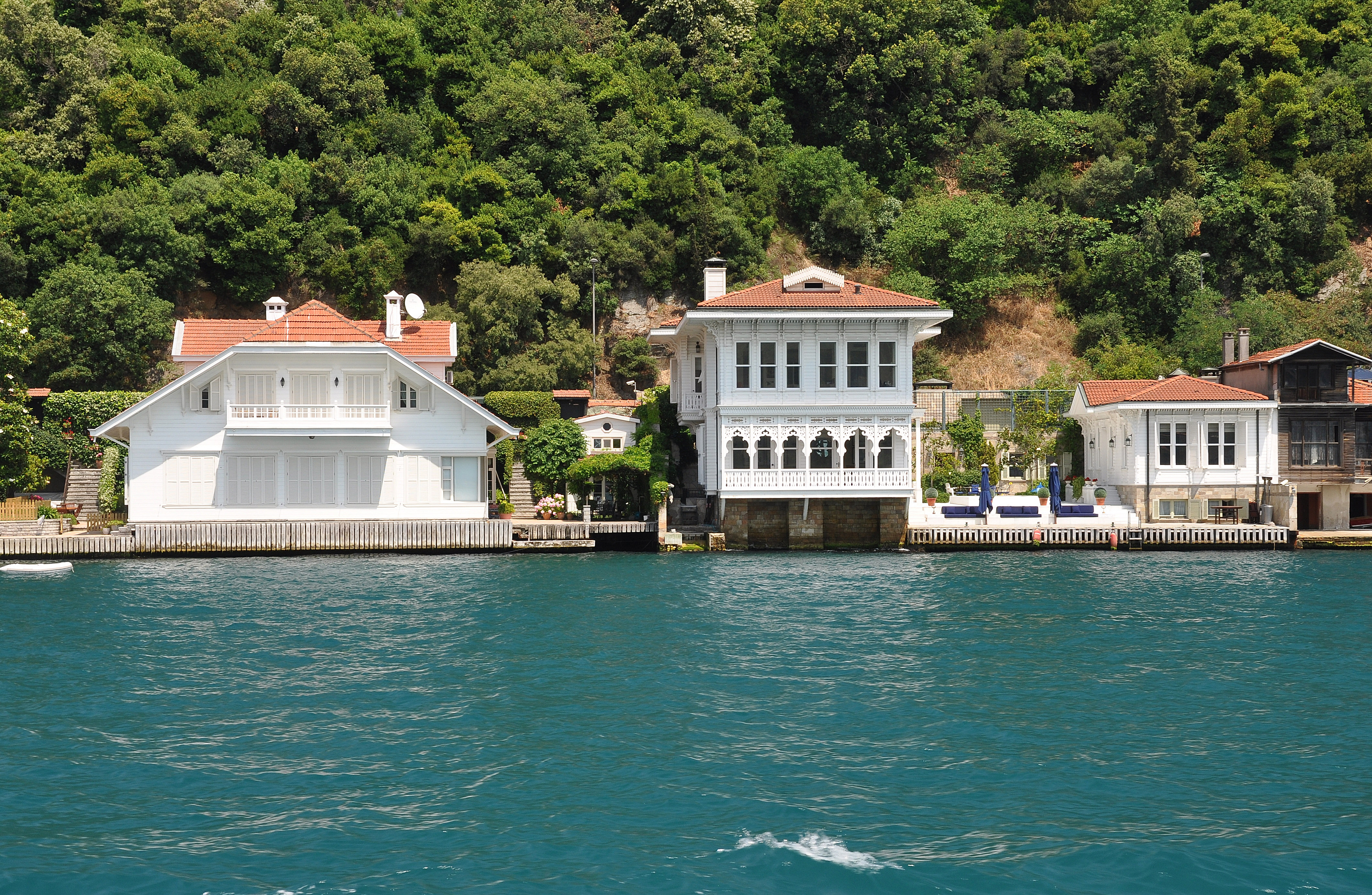
Yalı of Ali Mazhar Bey (left), Yalı of Ethem Pertev Bey (middle)

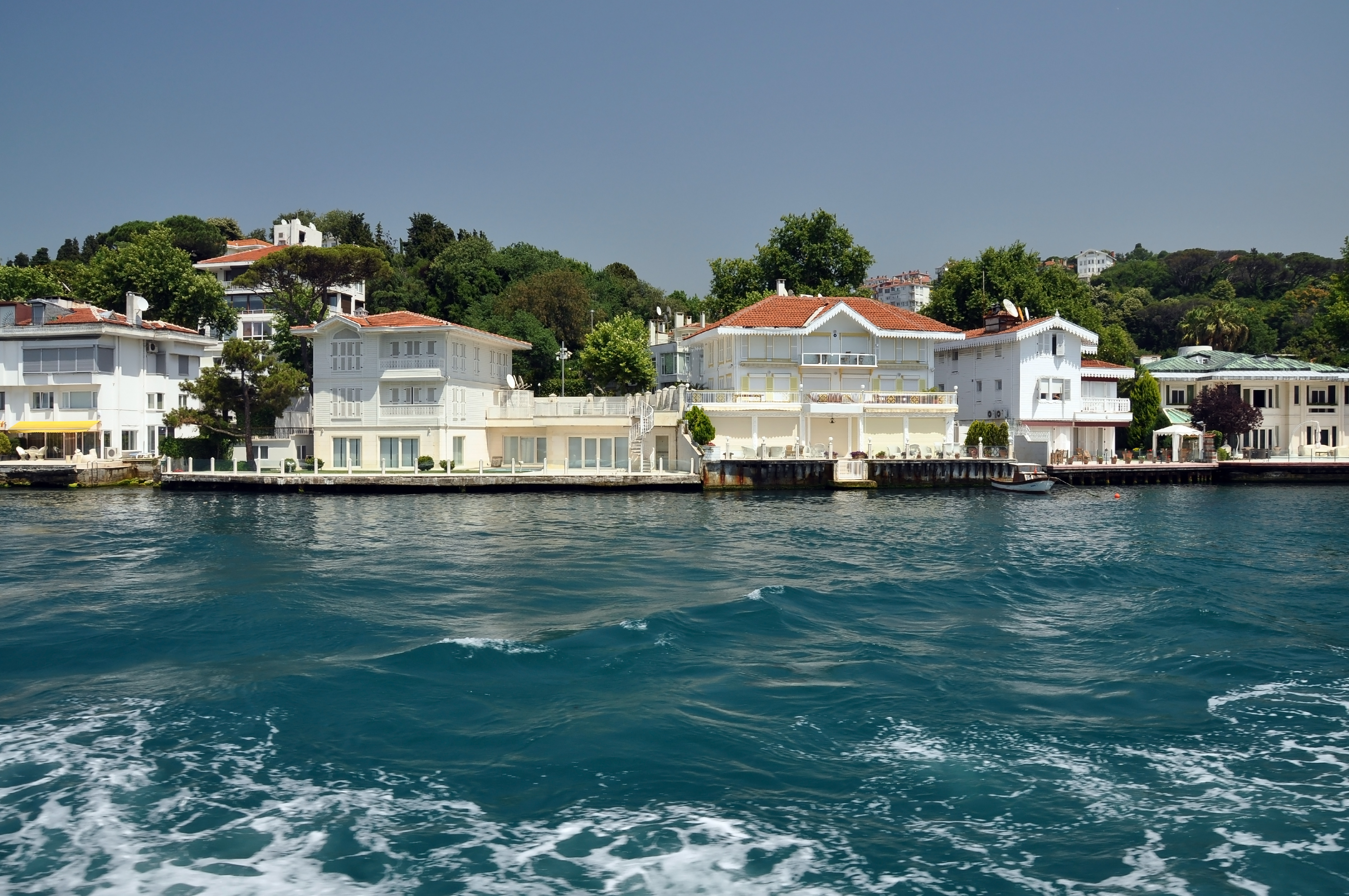
Yalı of Elbiseci Ahmet Bey

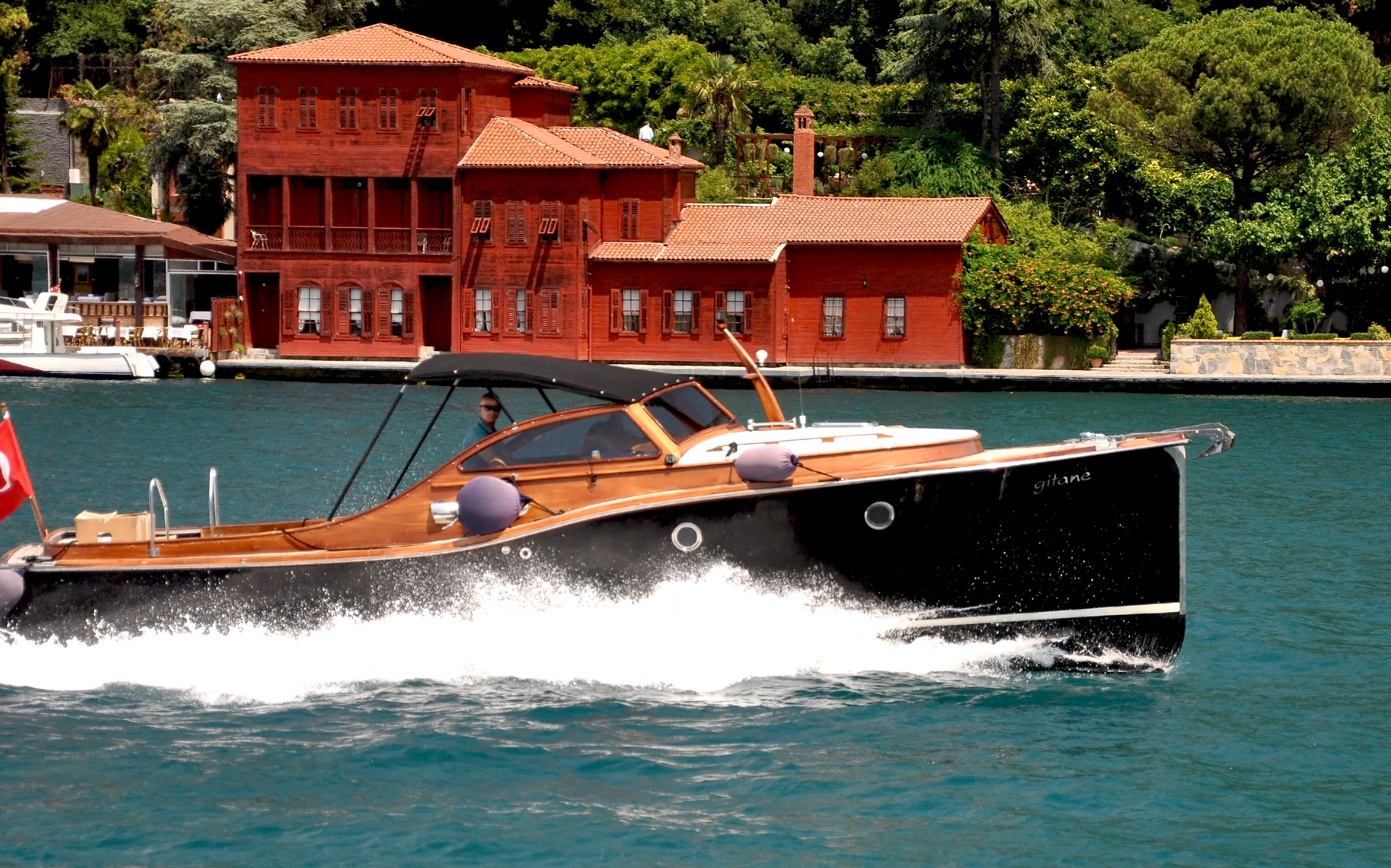
Yalı of (Chief Physician) Hekimbaşı Salih Efendi

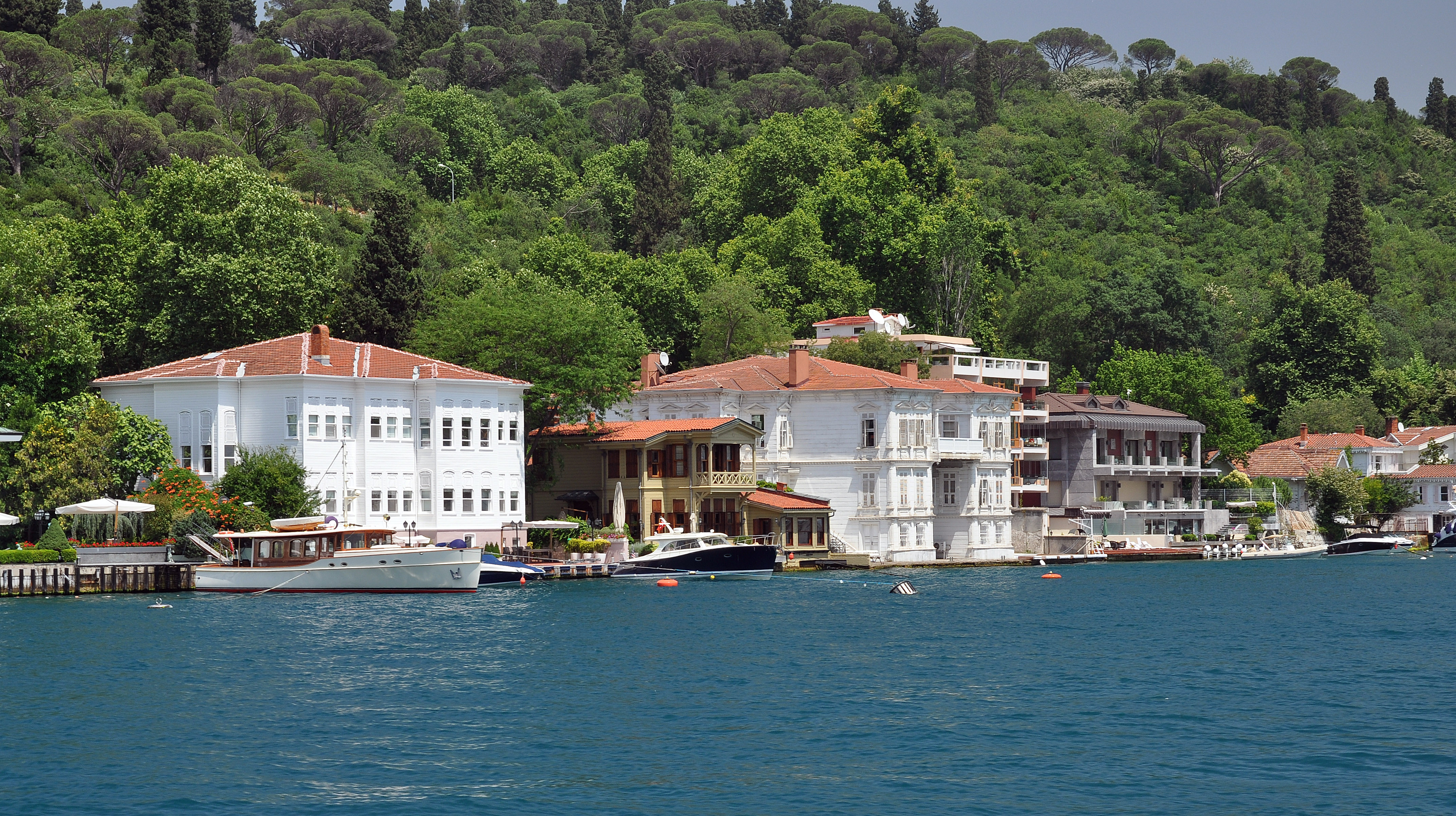
Yalı of Yağlıkçı Hacı Reşit Bey (left), Yalı of (Princess) Prenses Rukiye (middle)

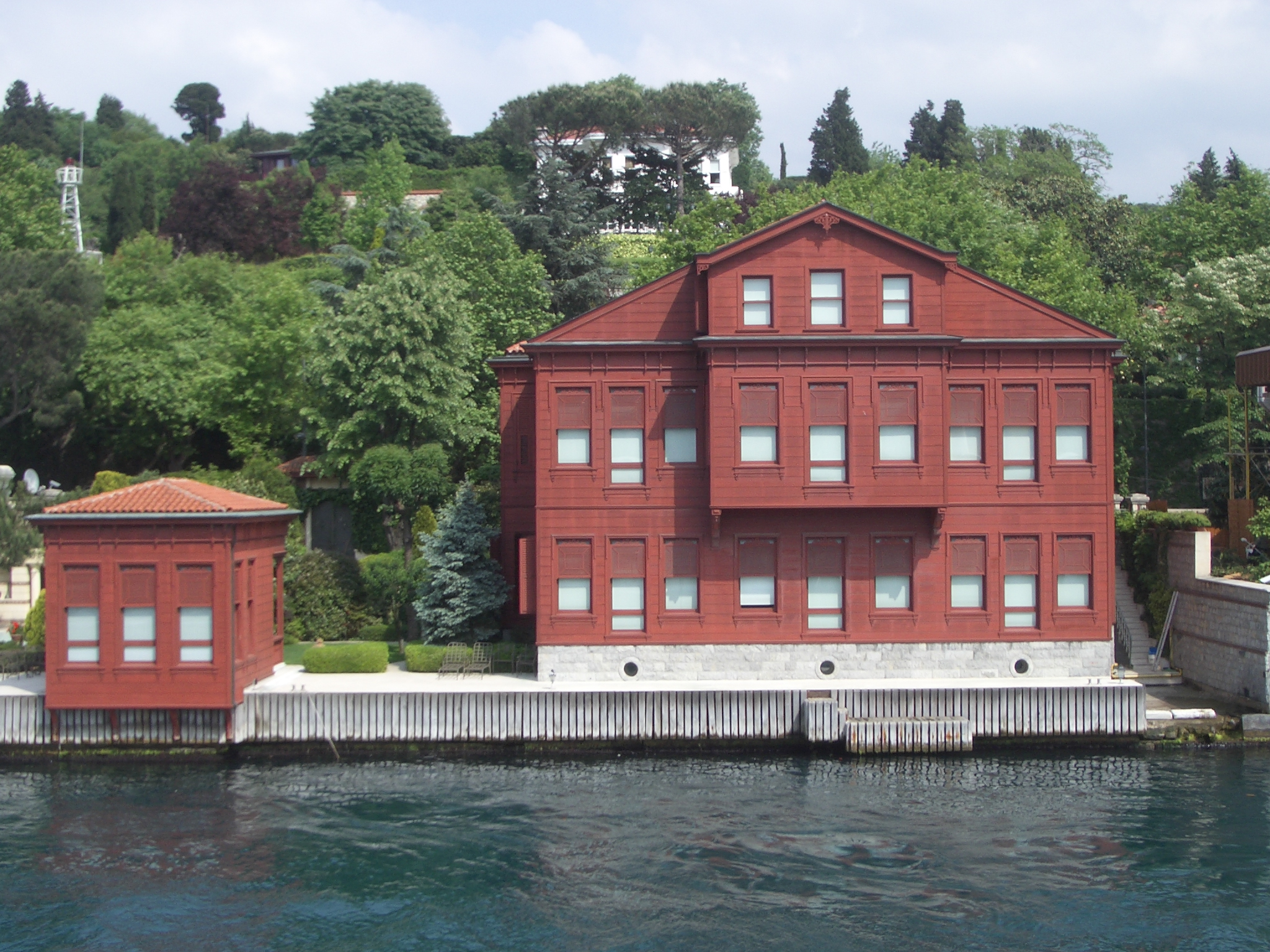
Yalı of Yedi Sekiz Hasan Pasha

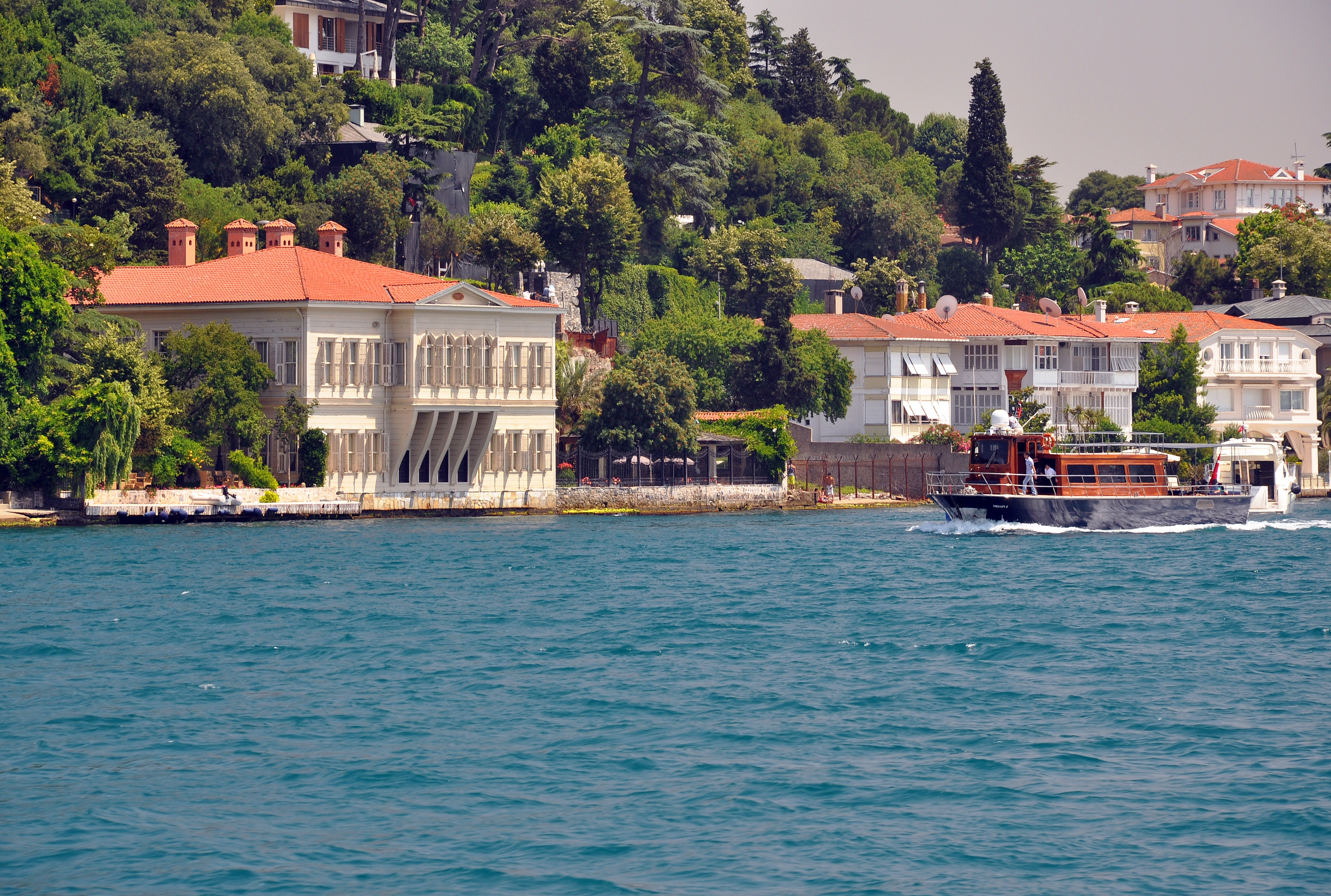
Yalı of Zarif Mustafa Pasha

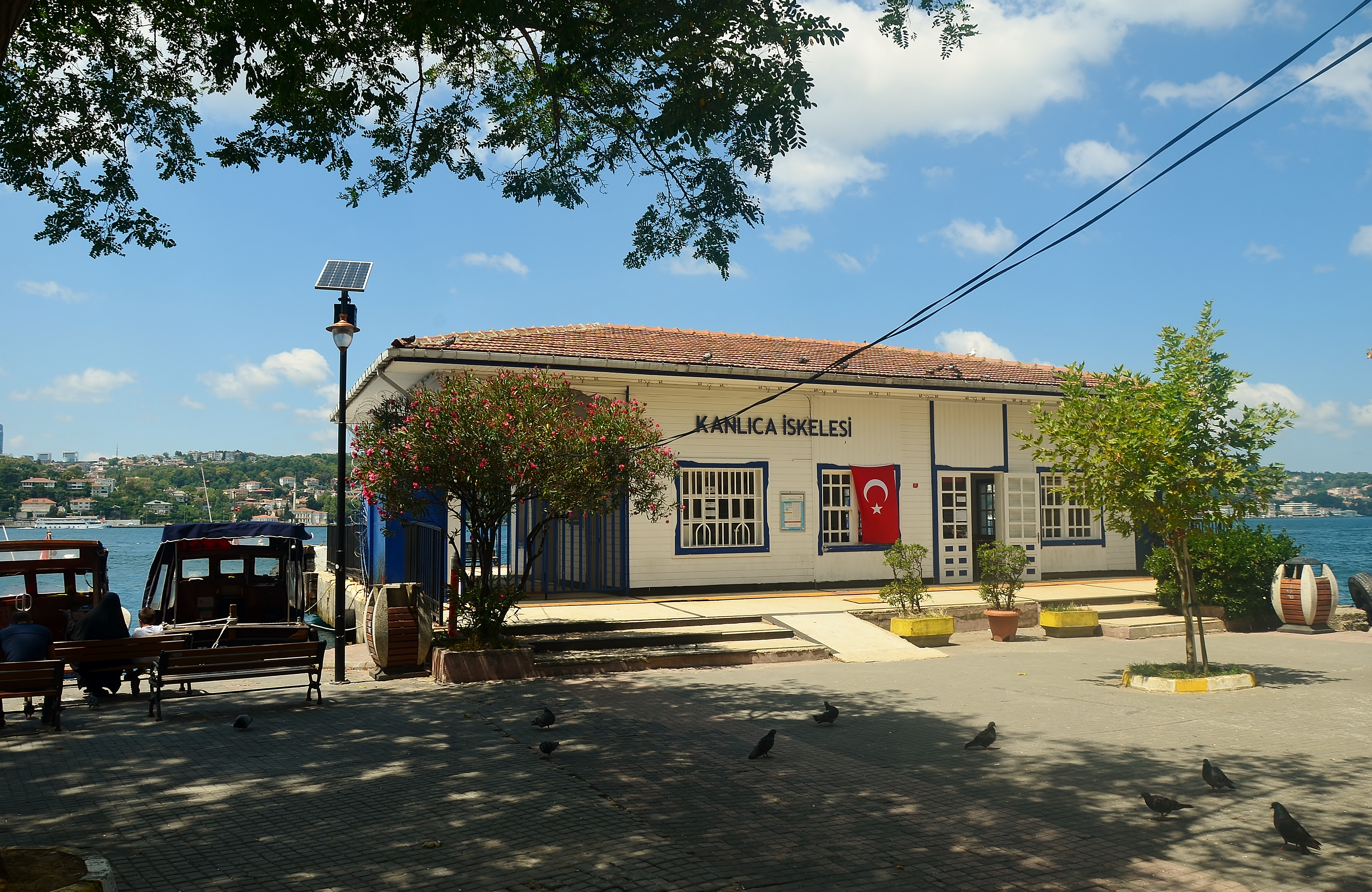
Passenger ferry pier of Kanlıca

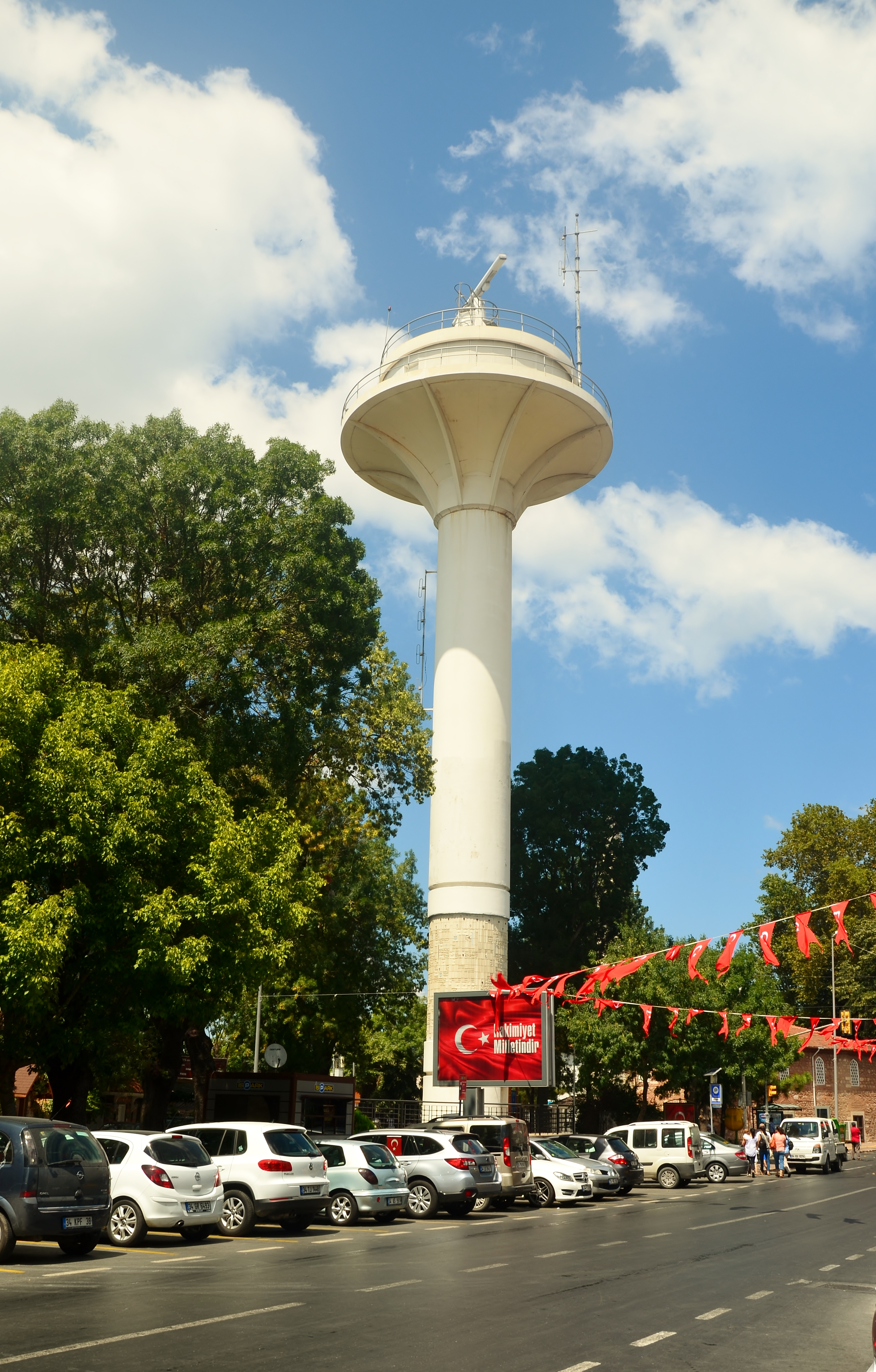
Kanlıca radar tower for marine navigation in Bosphorus

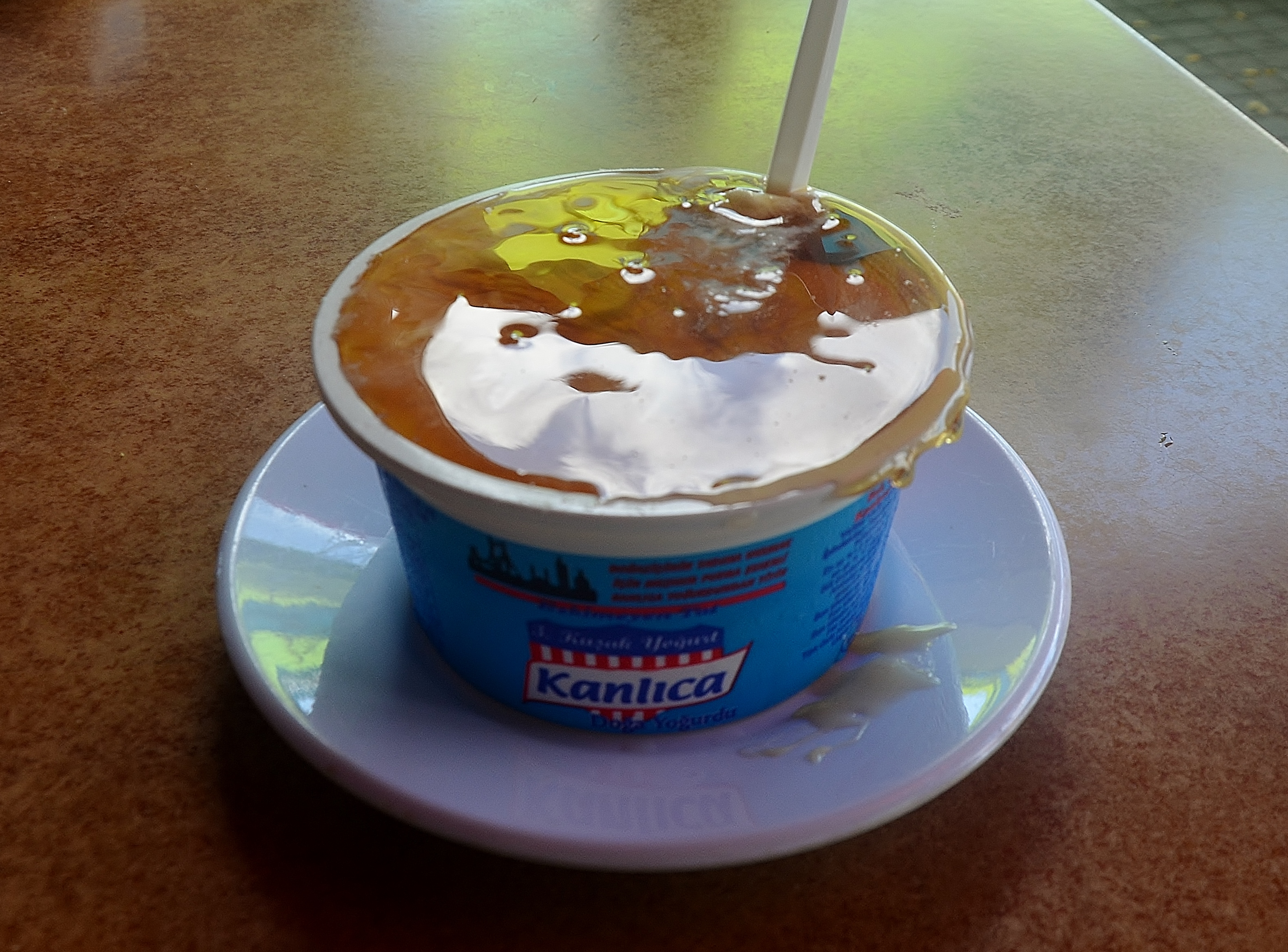
Honey-topped Kanlıca yogurt
