= Kildare Senior Football League Division 3 =

Gaelic football competition

Kildare Senior Football League Division 3 is an annual Gaelic football competition contested by the Kildare GAA clubs. Twelve clubs play 11 games and are awarded two points per win and one point per draw. The top two teams qualify to play in the League Final.

== Finals listed by year ==
Year	Winner	Score	Opponent	Score
2024	Grange	2-15	Milltown	2-11
2023	Rathangan	1-07	Monasterevin	0-9
2022	Allenwood	1-20	Sallins	1-13
2021	Ballymore Eustace	2-15	Kilcullen	0-10
2020	No competition due to the impact of the COVID-19 pandemic on Gaelic games			
2019	Monasterevin	3-11	Sallins	1-10
2018				
2017	Two Mile House	4-11	Rathangan	2-11
2016				
2015	Ballyteague	1-07	Castlemitchell	1-06
2014	Nurney	0-13	Suncroft	1-06
2013	Two Mile House	1-15	Ballykelly	1-10
2012	Sallins	0-16	Grangenolvin	2-04
2011	Eadestown	4-14	Robertstown	1-10 aet
2010	Clogherinkoe	1-14	Caragh	0-09
2009	Suncroft	0-13	Moorefield	2-06
2008	Two Mile House	2-10	Rheban	1-07
2007				
2006	Nurney	1-07	Grangenolvin	0-06
2005				
2004	St. Kevin's	1-12	Rheban	1-07
2003	Kill	1-11	Castelmitchell	1-04
2002	Ballyteague	0-11	Eadestown	0-08
2001	Sallins	0-11	Ardclough	0-09
2000				
1999	Ballymore Eustace		Confey	
1998	Milltown			
1997	St. Kevin's	0-11	Ellistown	1-08
1996	Rheban			
