= Kildare Senior Football League Division 4 =

Kildare Senior Football League Division 4 is an annual Gaelic football competition contested by the Kildare GAA clubs. 14 clubs play 13 games and are awarded 2 points per win and 1 point per draw. The top two teams qualify to play in the League Final.

== Finals listed by year ==
Year	Winner	Score	Opponent	Score
2024	Athgarvan	3-09	Rathcoffey	0-11
2023	Milltown	1-13	Suncroft	0-10
2022	Grange	1-13	Straffan	1-11
2021				
2020	No competition due to the impact of the COVID-19 pandemic on Gaelic games			
2019	Caragh	5-14	Rheban	0-14
2018				
2017				
2016				
2015				
2014				
2013				
2012	Confey	2-08	Castledermot	1-07
2011	Maynooth	3-14	Celbridge	2-12
2010	Round Towers	1-16	Naas	1-05
2009				
2008	Maynooth		Confey	
2007	Confey	0-09	Celbridge	0-08
2006				
2005				
2004				
2003	Straffan	1-09	Nurney	0-08
2002	Cappagh			
