= Kildare Senior Football League Division 2 =

Kildare Senior Football League Division 2 is an annual Gaelic football competition contested by the Kildare GAA clubs. 16 clubs play 15 games and are awarded 2 points per win and 1 point per draw. The top two teams qualify to play in the League Final.

== Finals listed by year ==
| Year | Winner | Score | Opponent | Score |
|---|---|---|---|---|
| 2025 | Johnstownbridge | 4-24 | Milltown | 1-17 |
| 2024 | Allenwood | 0-19 | St. Laurence's | 1-12 |
| 2023 | Maynooth | 2-10 | Sallins | 1-10 |
| 2022 | Leixlip | 0-16 | Johnstownbridge | 1-06 |
| 2021 | Eadestown | 1-16 | Clane | 0-10 |
| 2020 | No competition due to the impact of the COVID-19 pandemic on Gaelic games | | | |
| 2019 | Castledermot | 0-15 | Raheens | 0-11 |
| 2018 | Raheens | 2-16 | Carbury | 1-14 |
| 2017 | St Kevin's | 1-25 | Round Towers | 2-19 |
| 2016 | Clogherinkoe | 2-10 | Two Mile House | 2-8 |
| 2015 | St. Laurence's | 4-13 | Raheens | 0-06 |
| 2014 | Allenwood | | Kilcock | |
| 2013 | Raheens | 2-13 | Round Towers | 1-10 |
| 2012 | Castledermot | 1-11 | St. Kevin's | 1-09 |
| 2011 | Clane | 1-14 | Allenwood | 0-11 |
| 2010 | Johnstownbridge | 0-09 | Confey | 0-08 |
| 2009 | Athy | 0-14 | Naas | 0-11 |
| 2008 | St. Kevin's | 0-15 | Maynooth | 0-07 |
| 2007 | | | | |
| 2006 | Celbridge | 0-14 | Sallins | 0-07 |
| 2005 | Celbridge | | | |
| 2004 | Confey | 0-07 | Rathangan | 0-06 |
| 2003 | Ballymore Eustace | 3-02 | Sallins | 0-10 |
| 2002 | Naas | 1-07 | Clane | 2-04 |
| 2001 | Athy | 1-16 | Confey | 0-10 |
| 2000 | Sarsfields | | | |
| 1999 | Raheens | | Maynooth | |
| 1998 | Carbury | 2-15 | Rheban | 1-10 |
