= Kildangan GAA (County Kildare) =

Gaelic games club in County Kildare, Ireland

Kildangan
- Cill Daingin
- Founded: 1913
- County: Kildare
- Colours: Green with a yellow hoop
- Grounds: More O'Ferrall Park, Kildangan
- Coordinates: 53.0999°N 7.0010°W

Playing kits
Standard colours

Kildangan GAA is a Gaelic Athletic Association (GAA) club in Kildangan, County Kildare, Ireland, not to be confused with the similarly named Kildangan GAA, based in County Tipperary. The main activity in the club is Gaelic football. The club plays amalgamated with Ballykelly from U14s to minor.

== History ==
=== Background ===
In the Kildangan area, Riverstown Charles J Kickhams affiliated in 1888, with officers James Mooney and Patrick Murray listed as having attended the 1889 convention. Games were played in Riverstown, in a field opposite John "Shirty" Sextons house. Subsequently, a Gaelic football team was formed in 1913 in Kildangan, playing their first game against Booleigh on Sunday 4 October 1913. This team disbanded in 1915, some of the players transferring to Monasterevin.

After a hiatus of some ten years, Kildangan GAA reformed in 1925 and appeared in the 1925 Junior League Final against Two Mile House. No result of that match has been found. Kildangan had their first success when they won the Junior league in 1930. Their next appearance in a league final was in 1931, where after two replays, they were beaten by Straffan on a scoreline of 1–5 to 0–4. Kildangan made amends by winning the following years competition. Kildangan also had appearances in league finals in 1946 and 1952.

Kildangan played their first Junior championship final in 1936, where they were beaten by Celbridge, who scored 3–6 to Kildangan's 1–2.
Kildangan next appeared in a Junior Championship final in 1941, where the team was beaten by Ardclough.

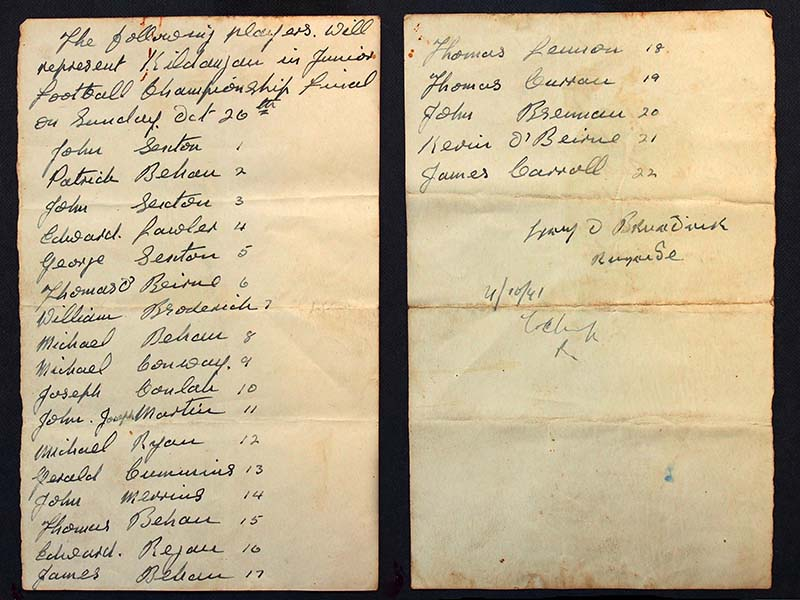
Kildangan Team Sheet from 1941 Junior Final

In 1942, Kildangan beat Cappagh in the final of the Junior Championship, played on 1 November 1942 in Newbridge. The following year, Kildangan reached the 1943 Intermediate final, again against Ardclough. The score in the final was Ardclough 2-12 Kildangan 1–3, the game was played in front of a then record attendance of 1658 spectators in Newbridge.

The following years were somewhat barren, and the club ceased to exist in the 1960s, due mainly to high unemployment and an exodus of some of several players to Round Towers.

The club was relaunched in 1970. In 1980, Kildangan were narrowly beaten in the Junior Championship final by Robertstown. Following this final, the club once again folded due to a lack of players. However the underage scene remained active and a number of Kildangan underage players played on a joint Kildangan Nurney team.

=== Reemergence ===
The demographics of Kildangan and its hinterland altered considerably at the start of the 21st century, with the Celtic Tiger bringing an increase in population to the area. The club was re-established in 2001, mainly with players from surrounding clubs, many of whom had played with Nurney underage, and also migrants to the area. Success followed rapidly and Kildangan won the Junior league in 2003. In the year, Kildangan won the Junior league and sealed a win over Sarsfields in the Junior C final, on a scoreline of 0–14 to 0–10.

In 2005, Kildangan contested the Junior B final against Caragh, where they were beaten narrowly.

In 2008, Kildangan won the Division 5 league title by beating Suncroft in the final on a scoreline of 0–11 to 1–7.

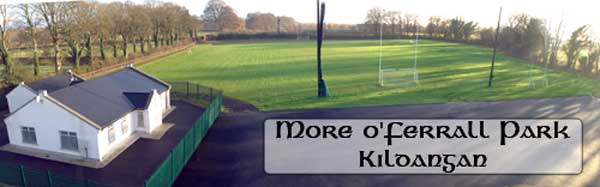
More O Ferrall Park, Kildangan

In early 2009, Kildangan GAA moved to a new location, complete with dressing rooms and a clubhouse, named More O'Ferrall Park. The new grounds were officially opened by Leinster council chairman at the time, Seamus Howlin, on 21 May 2010.

Kildangan were also recognised as Kildare GAA's "Club of the Year" in November 2010.

In 2015, Kildangan won the Junior B final against Ballymore Eustace on a scoreline of 2–8 to 1–7.

== Camogie ==
Kildangan Camogie club was founded in 1934, adopting the cream and scarlet colours of Kildangan Stud. Games were played in Lennox's field in Richardstown. Following a successful number of years, the camogie club lapsed in 1939.

== Ladies Football ==
In 2007, a ladies Gaelic football Club, Kildangan Nurney was established with players from Kildangan, Nurney and surrounding areas.

== Underage ==
Kildangan GAA has placed an emphasis on underage coaching since its re-establishment, with both boys and girls playing at all categories up to Under 21. In 2015, Kildangan amalgamated from under 14 up to under 21 with Ballykelly, under the Abbey Rangers banner.

== Players ==
Full back Jack Sexton represented Kildare at Senior Level in 1936–37 as did goalkeeper John (Shirty) Sexton around this time. Other former Kildangan players were Paddy and Eddie O'Loughlin, Sean Duffy, Bill Broderick, The Connell brothers Martin and Sean, Mick Maher (who played inter-county for Westmeath), Joe Conlan and Jimmy Mullaly.

Former association football player Sean Francis also played for Kildangan GAA. He made his Gaelic football debut as a substitute in the 2005 Junior B Championship Final against Caragh. In 2006, he received the club's "Footballer of the Year" award.

== Honours ==
- 1930- Kildare Junior Football League
- 1932- Kildare Junior Football League
- 1942- Kildare Junior Football Championship
- 2003- Kildare Junior C League Championship
- 2004- Kildare Junior B League Championship
- 2004- Kildare Junior C Football Championship
- 2008- Division 5 Football League Championship
- 2015- Kildare Junior B Football Championship

== Bibliography ==
- Kildare GAA: A Centenary History, by Eoghan Corry, CLG Chill Dara, 1984, ISBN 0-9509370-0-2 hb ISBN 0-9509370-1-0 pb
- Soaring Sliothar-A Centenary of Kildare Camogie 1904–2004 by Joan O'Flynn, Chill Dara Camogie Board, 2004
