= 2024 Kildare Senior Football Championship =

Gaelic Football Senior Championship

131st Kildare Senior Football Championship
Tournament details
- County: Kildare
- Province: Leinster
- Year: 2024
- Trophy: Dermot Bourke Cup
- Sponsor: Joe Mallon Motors
- Date: 9 August 2025 - 27 October 2025
- Teams: 16
- Defending champions: Naas

Winners
- Champions: Naas (12th win)

Runners-up
- Runners-up: Celbridge

Promotion/Relegation
- Relegated team(s): St. Laurence's

Other
- Matches played: 42
- Website: Kildare GAA

The 2024 Kildare Senior Football Championship was the 131st edition of the Kildare GAA's premier club Gaelic football tournament for senior graded teams in County Kildare, Ireland. The tournament consists of 16 teams with the winner going on to represent Kildare in the Leinster Senior Club Football Championship. The championship started with a preliminary round sorted by a random draw, followed by a group stage and finally a knockout stage.

Naas were the defending champions this year after they defeated Celbridge in the previous years final. This was Naas' 3rd Senior Football Championship in a row.

Allenwood returned to the senior grade for the first time since 2001 after defeating Castledermot in the 2024 Kildare Intermediate Football Championship by 0-11 to 1-7.

On 27 October, Naas defeated Celbridge in a replay of last years final 1-7 to 1-6. This was Naas' 12th championship and their 4th in a row.

St. Laurence's were defeated by Kilcock in the Relegation Play-off 0-15 to 1-6, meaning that they would play in the 2025 Kildare Intermediate Football Championship for the first time since 1980.

== Championship structure ==
The 2024 Senior Football Championship consisted of 16 teams drawn against each other in the preliminary round. The winners of the games were drawn into a 'winners' group, while the losers were drawn into a 'losers' group. These groups consist of 4 teams each. In the winners groups, the top two teams head straight into the quarter-finals while the 3rd placed team plays in a preliminary quarter-final. In the losers groups, the top placed team heads straight into the quarter-final, the 2nd placed team heads into a preliminary quarter-final, and the last placed team heads into a relegation play-off to retain their senior status.

== Team changes ==
The following teams have changed division since the 2024 championship season.

=== To S.F.C. ===
Promoted from 2023 I.F.C.

- Allenwood - (Intermediate Champions)

=== From S.F.C. ===
Relegated to 2024 I.F.C.

- Ballyteague

== Participating teams ==
Club	Location	2023 Championship Position	2024 Championship Position
Allenwood	Allenwood	2023 I.F.C Champions	Non-Qualifier
Athy	Athy	Semi-Finalist	Semi-Finalist
Carbury	Carbury	Non-Qualifier	Non-Qualifier
Celbridge	Celbridge	Runners-Up	Runners-Up
Clane	Clane	Semi-Finalist	Quarter-Finalist
Clogherinkoe	Clogherinkoe	Preliminary Quarter-Finalist	Preliminary Quarter-Finalist
Confey	Leixlip	Non-Qualifier	Non-Qualifier
Eadestown	Eadestown	Preliminary Quarter-Finalist	Preliminary Quarter-Finalist
Johnstownbridge	Johnstownbridge	Quarter-Finalist	Quarter-Finalist
Kilcock	Kilcock	Non-Qualifier	Relegation Finalist
Maynooth	Maynooth	Non-Qualifier	Non-Qualifier
Moorefield	Newbridge	Quarter-Finalist	Quarter-Finalist
Naas	Naas	Champions	Champions
Sarsfield	Newbridge	Quarter-Finalist	Semi-Finalist
St. Laurences	Narraghmore & Ballitore	Relegation Finalist	Relegated to 2025 I.F.C
Raheens	Caragh	Quarter-Finalist	Quarter-Finalist

== Preliminary round ==
All 16 teams were randomly drawn to play one of the other 16. The winners of these games headed into the 'winners' groups (Group A and B) while the losers were placed into the 'losers' group (Group C and D).

The draw for the preliminary round of the championship was made on 10 May 2024.

Preliminary Round 1	Naas	0-14 (14) – (9) 0-9	Johnstownbridge
		Report

Preliminary Round 2	Celbridge	1-13 (16) – (11) 0-11	Raheens
		Report

Preliminary Round 3	Moorefield	0-9 (9) – (13) 1-10	Sarsfields
		Report

Preliminary Round 4	Allenwood	1-10 (13) – (12) 0-12	Kilcock
		Report

Preliminary Round 5	Maynooth	3-16 (25) – (27) 1-24	Athy
		Report

Preliminary Round 6	St. Laurence's	0-11 (11) – (16) 2-10	Clogherinkoe
		Report

Preliminary Round 7	Clane	2-9 (15) – (21) 2-15	Eadestown
		Report

Preliminary Round 8	Confey	2-12 (16) – (10) 0-10	Carbury
		Report

== Group stage ==
They were four groups called Group A, B, C and D. These groups were defined by the winners and losers of the preliminary round, with the winners being in Group A and B, and the losers being in Group C and D. In Group A and B, the top two teams headed straight into the quarter-finals while the 3rd placed team played in a preliminary quarter-final. In Group C and D, the 1st placed team headed straight into the quarter-finals with the second placed team playing a preliminary quarter-final. The last placed teams in Group C and D went to play a relegation play-off to determine which team got relegated.

The draw for the group stages of the championship was made on 12 August 2024.

=== Group A ===
Advance to Quarter-Finals Advance to Preliminary Quarter-Final

Team	Matches				Score			Pts
Team	Pld	W	D	L	For	Against	Diff	Pts
Naas	3	3	0	0	58	27	+31	6
Sarsfield	3	1	1	1	42	40	+2	3
Eadestown	3	1	1	1	41	41	0	3
Confey	3	0	0	3	29	62	-33	0

==== Round 1 ====
Round 1	Sarsfield	1-9 (12) – (12) 1-9	Eadestown
		Report

Round 1	Confey	0-5 (5) – (25) 3-16	Naas
		Report

==== Round 2 ====
Round 2	Sarsfield	2-17 (23) – (16) 2-10	Confey
		Report

Round 2	Eadestown	1-12 (15) – (21) 2-15	Naas
		Report

==== Round 3 ====
Round 3	Naas	0-12 (12) – (7) 0-7	Sarsfield
		Report

Round 3	Confey	1-5 (8) – (14) 2-8	Eadestown
		Report

=== Group B ===
Advance to Quarter-Finals Advance to Preliminary Quarter-Final

Team	Matches				Score			Pts
Team	Pld	W	D	L	For	Against	Diff	Pts
Celbridge	3	3	0	0	65	39	+26	6
Athy	3	2	0	1	55	45	+10	4
Clogherinkoe	3	1	0	2	47	47	0	2
Allenwood	3	0	0	3	40	76	-36	0

==== Round 1 ====
Round 1	Celbridge	2-19 (25) – (12) 0-12	Allenwood
		Report

Round 1	Athy	0-13 (13) – (11) 0-11	Clogherinkoe
		Report

==== Round 2 ====
Round 2	Athy	3-8 (17) – (18) 1-15	Celbridge
		Report

Round 2	Clogherinkoe	4-14 (26) – (12) 1-9	Allenwood
		Report

==== Round 3 ====
Round 3	Allenwood	1-13 (16) – (25) 5-10	Athy
		Report

Round 3	Celbridge	2-16 (22) – (10) 1-7	Clogherinkoe
		Report

=== Group C ===
Advance to Quarter-Finals Advance to Preliminary Quarter-Final Advance to Relegation Play-Off

Team	Matches				Score			Pts
Team	Pld	W	D	L	For	Against	Diff	Pts
Raheens	3	2	1	0	63	32	+31	5
Johnstownbridge	3	2	1	0	36	27	+9	5
Carbury	3	1	0	2	29	35	-6	3
St. Laurence's	3	0	0	3	23	57	-34	0

==== Round 1 ====
Round 1	Carbury	2-4 (10) – (18) 3-9	Raheens
		Report

Round 1	Johnstownbridge	1-11 (14) – (6) 0-6	St. Laurence's
		Report

==== Round 2 ====
Round 2	Carbury	0-10 (10) – (11) 1-8	Johnstownbridge
		Report

Round 2	Raheens	7-13 (34) – (11) 1-8	St. Laurence's
		Report

==== Round 3 ====
Round 3	St. Laurence's	0-6 (6) – (9) 0-9	Carbury
		Report

Round 3	Johnstownbridge	0-11 (11) – (11) 0-11	Raheens
		Report

=== Group D ===
Advance to Quarter-Finals Advance to Preliminary Quarter-Final Advance to Relegation Play-Off

Team	Matches				Score			Pts
Team	Pld	W	D	L	For	Against	Diff	Pts
Moorefield	3	3	0	0	58	35	+23	6
Clane	3	1	0	2	41	44	-3	2
Maynooth	3	1	0	2	48	47	1	2
Kilcock	3	1	0	2	39	60	-21	2

==== Round 1 ====
Round 1	Moorefield	2-10 (16) – (14) 1-11	Maynooth
		Report

Round 1	Kilcock	0-8 (8) – (20) 2-14	Clane
		Report

==== Round 2 ====
Round 2	Moorefield	2-18 (24) – (11) 0-11	Kilcock
		Report

Round 2	Maynooth	2-12 (18) – (11) 0-11	Clane
		Report

==== Round 3 ====
Round 3	Clane	0-10 (10) – (18) 2-12	Moorefield
		Report

Round 3	Kilcock	3-11 (20) – (16) 1-13	Maynooth
		Report

== Knockout-stages ==
The 1st and 2nd placed teams in Group A and B and the 1st placed teams in Group C and D qualified for the quarter-finals. The 3rd placed teams in Group A and B and the 2nd placed teams in Group C and D qualified for the preliminary quarter-finals. Quarter-final pairings were drawn with the winners of Group A and B playing the winners of the preliminary-quarter-finals, while the 2nd placed teams of Group A and B played the winners of Group C and D.

Preliminary Quarter-Finals
Clane	2-10
Eadestown	0-09
Clogherinkoe	1-11
Johnstownbridge	1-12

Quarter-Finals
Sarsfields	1-09
Moorefield	0-11
Celbridge	1-15
Clane	0-07
Naas	3-19
Johnstownbridge	0-07
Raheens	1-13
Athy	3-15

Semi-Finals
Sarsfields	0-12
Celbridge	1-11
Naas	3-13
Athy	1-09

Final
Celbridge	1-06
Naas	1-07

=== Preliminary quarter-finals ===
Preliminary Quarter-Final 1	Clane	2-10 (16) – (9) 0-9	Eadestown
		Report

Preliminary Quarter-Final 2	Clogherinkoe	1-11 (14) – (15) 1-12	Johnstownbridge
		Report

=== Quarter-finals ===
Quarter-Final 1	Celbridge	1-15 (18) – (7) 0-7	Clane
		Report

Quarter-Final 2	Athy	3-15 (24) – (16) 1-13	Raheens
		Report

Quarter-Final 3	Naas	3-19 (28) – (7) 0-7	Johnstownbridge
		Report

Quarter-Final 4	Moorefield	0-11 (11) – (12) 1-9	Sarsfields
		Report

=== Semi-finals ===
Semi-Final 1	Celbridge	1-11 (14) – (12) 0-12	Sarsfields
	Pts: Aaron Browne 0-7 (4f, 1m), Killian Browne 1-1, Kevin O'Callaghan 0-1, Tony Archbold 0-1, Cormac O'Sullivan 0-1	Report	Pts: Callum Bolton 0-3 (1f), Barry Coffey 0-3 (3f), Karl Hartley 0-1, Conor Hartley 0-1, Darragh Ryan 0-1, Ben McCormack 0-1, Shane Doyle 0-1 (f), Alan Smith 0-1 (m)

Semi-Final 2	Naas	3-13 (22) – (12) 1-9	Athy
	Pts: Darragh Kirwan 1-6 (4f), Dermot Hanafin 0-3, Alex Beirne 1-0, James Burke 1-0, Luke Mullins 0-1 (f), Robert Fitzgerald 0-1, Paul McDermott 0-1, Cathal Daly 0-1	Report	Pts: Sean Moore 1-0, Niall Kelly 0-3 (2f), Kevin Feely 0-3 (1f), Padraic Spillane 0-1, Liam McGovern 0-1 (f), Cathal Kennedy 0-1 (f)

=== Final ===
27 October 2024 Final	Celbridge	1-6 (9) – (10) 1-7	Naas
		(HT: 0-4 - 1-3)
	Pts: Hugh McGrillen 1-0, Killian Browne 0-2, Shane McNamara 0-1 (f), Fergal Conway 0-1, Tony Archbold 0-1, Davy Hughes 0-1 (f)	Report	Pts: Darragh Kirwan 0-5 (1f), Dermot Hanafin 1-0, Alex Beirne 0-1 (f), Neil Aherne 0-1

== Relegation play-off ==
The relegation play-off consisted of the 4th placed teams in Group C and D. The winners of the playoff retained their status as a senior level club, while the loser would be relegated to the Kildare Intermediate Football Championship.

Relegation Play-Off	Kilcock	0-15 (15) – (9) 1-6	St. Laurence's
	Pts: Sean O'Sullivan 0-8 (6f), Ciaran Murray 0-2, Cameron Nairn 0-1, David Duke 0-1, Brendan Gibbons 0-1, Danny Maguire 0-1, Niall O'Sullivan 0-1	Report	Pts: Jason McHugh 0-3 (1f), TJ Nolan 1-0, Oisin Grufferty 0-1, Senan Murphy 0-1, Tom Dooley 0-1
