= 2025 Kildare Senior Football Championship =

Gaelic Football Senior Championship

132nd Kildare Senior Football Championship
Tournament details
- County: Kildare
- Province: Leinster
- Year: 2025
- Trophy: Dermot Bourke Cup
- Sponsor: Joe Mallon Motors
- Date: 15 August 2025 - 19 October 2025
- Teams: 16
- Defending champions: Naas

Winners
- Champions: Athy (8th win)

Runners-up
- Runners-up: Naas
- Manager: Philly McMahon

Promotion/Relegation
- Relegated team(s): Confey

Other
- Matches played: 42
- Website: Kildare GAA

The 2025 Kildare Senior Football Championship was the 132nd edition of the Kildare GAA's premier club Gaelic football tournament for senior graded teams in County Kildare, Ireland. The tournament consists of 16 teams with the winner going on to represent Kildare in the Leinster Senior Club Football Championship. The championship started with a preliminary round sorted by a random draw, followed by a group stage and finally a knockout stage.

Naas were the defending champions this year after they defeated Celbridge in the previous years final. This was Naas' 4th Senior Football Championship in a row.

Caragh returned to the senior grade for the first time since 2001 after defeating Leixlip in the 2024 Kildare Intermediate Football Championship.

On 19 October, Athy defeated Naas 1–17 to 0–18 in the final. This is Athy's 8th championship win and their first since 2020.

Confey were defeated by Allenwood in the Relegation Play-off 1–16 to 0–13, meaning that they will play in the 2026 Kildare Intermediate Football Championship for the first time since 2011.

== Championship structure ==
The 2025 Senior Football Championship consisted of 16 teams drawn against each other in the preliminary round. The winners of the games were drawn into a 'winners' group, while the losers were drawn into a 'losers' group. These groups consist of 4 teams each. In the winners groups, the top two teams head straight into the quarter-finals while the 3rd placed team plays in a preliminary quarter-final. In the losers groups, the top placed team heads straight into the quarter-final, the 2nd placed team heads into a preliminary quarter-final, and the last placed team heads into a relegation play-off to retain their senior status.

== Team changes ==
The following teams have changed division since the 2024 championship season.

=== To S.F.C. ===
Promoted from 2024 I.F.C.

- Caragh - (Intermediate Champions)

=== From S.F.C. ===
Relegated to 2025 I.F.C.

- St. Laurence's

== Participating teams ==
The 16 teams that participated in the 2025 competition were:

Club	Location	2024 Championship Position	2025 Championship Position
Allenwood	Allenwood	Non-Qualifier	Relegation Finalist
Athy	Athy	Semi-Finalist	Champions
Caragh	Prosperous	2024 I.F.C Champions	Quarter-Finalist
Carbury	Carbury	Non-Qualifier	Non-Qualifier
Celbridge	Celbridge	Runners-Up	Semi-Finalist
Clane	Clane	Quarter-Finalist	Quarter-Finalist
Clogherinkoe	Clogherinkoe	Preliminary Quarter-Finalist	Non-Qualifier
Confey	Leixlip	Non-Qualifier	Relegated to 2026 I.F.C
Eadestown	Eadestown	Preliminary Quarter-Finalist	Preliminary Quarter-Finalist
Johnstownbridge	Johnstownbridge	Quarter-Finalist	Quarter-Finalist
Kilcock	Kilcock	Relegation Finalist	Non-Qualifier
Maynooth	Maynooth	Non-Qualifier	Preliminary Quarter-Finalist
Moorefield	Newbridge	Quarter-Finalist	Quarter-Finalist
Naas	Naas	Champions	Runners-Up
Sarsfield	Newbridge	Semi-Finalist	Semi-Finalist
Raheens	Caragh	Quarter-Finalist	Non-Qualifier

== Preliminary round ==
All 16 teams were randomly drawn to play one of the other 16. The winners of these games headed into the 'winners' groups (Group A and B) while the losers were placed into the 'losers' group (Group C and D).

The draw for the preliminary round of the championship was made on 23 May 2025.

7 August 2025 Preliminary Round 1	Moorefield	2-10 (16) – (20) 2-14	Naas	Newbridge
		(HT: 0-5 - 0-5)		Venue: Cedral St. Conleth's
		Report		Referee: Niall Colgan

8 August 2025 Preliminary Round 2	Athy	1-20 (23) – (6) 0-6	Eadestown	Newbridge
		(HT: 1-14 - 0-4)		Venue: Cedral St. Conleth's
		Report		Referee: Ken Doyle

8 August 2025 Preliminary Round 3	Allenwood	1-16 (19) – (20) 3-11	Clogherinkoe	Newbridge
		(HT: 0-2 - 2-9)		Venue: Manguard Park
		Report		Referee: Billy O'Connell

9 August 2025 Preliminary Round 4	Kilcock	0-11 (11) – (29) 5-14	Maynooth	Newbridge
		(HT: 0-4 - 2-8)		Venue: Cedral St. Conleth's
		Report		Referee: Fergal Barry

9 August 2025 Preliminary Round 5	Celbridge	0-14 (14) – (8) 0-8	Clane	Newbridge
		(HT: 0-8 - 0-5)		Venue: Cedral St. Conleth's
		Report		Referee: Kieran Harris

10 August 2025 Preliminary Round 6	Caragh	1-15 (18) – (23) 2-17	Raheens	Newbridge
		(HT: 0-9 - 0-7)		Venue: Cedral St. Conleth's
		Report		Referee: Paddy McDermott

10 August 2025 Preliminary Round 7	Confey	0-13 (13) – (16) 0-16	Johnstownbridge	Newbridge
				Venue: Manguard Park
				Referee: Henry Barrett

10 August 2025 Preliminary Round 8	Carbury	0-13 (13) – (22) 2-16	Sarsfield	Newbridge
		(HT: 0-6 - 0-10)		Venue: Cedral St. Conleth's
		Report		Referee: Alan Archbold

== Group Stage ==
They were four groups called Group A, B, C and D. These groups were defined by the winners and losers of the preliminary round, with the winners being in Group A and B, and the losers being in Group C and D. In Group A and B, the top two teams headed straight into the quarter-finals while the 3rd placed team played in a preliminary quarter-final. In Group C and D, the 1st placed team headed straight into the quarter-finals with the second placed team playing a preliminary quarter-final. The last placed teams in Group C and D went to play a relegation play-off to determine which team got relegated.

The draw for the group stages of the championship was made on 10 August 2025.

=== Group A ===
Advance to Quarter-Finals Advance to Preliminary Quarter-Final

Team	Matches				Score			Pts
Team	Pld	W	D	L	For	Against	Diff	Pts
Celbridge	3	2	1	0	52	40	+12	5
Athy	3	2	0	1	70	46	+24	4
Johnstownbridge	3	1	1	1	75	62	+13	3
Clogherinkoe	3	0	0	3	37	86	-49	0

==== Round 1 ====
15 August 2025 Round 1	Athy	1-25 (28) – (11) 0-11	Clogherinkoe	Newbridge
19:45		(HT: 1-13 - 0-8)		Venue: Manguard Park
	Pts: Conor Doyle 1-4, Colm Moran 0-7 (4f, 1tp, 1tpf), Niall Kelly 0-3 (2f), Kevin Feely 0-3, Ronan Kelly 0-2, Brian Maher 0-2, Barry Kelly 0-1, James McGrath 0-1, David Hyland 0-1, Padraig Spillane 0-1	Report	Pts: Jimmy Lynch 0-5 (3f, 1tpf), Cein McMonagle 0-4 (1f, 1tp), Mark Nolan 0-1, Caelum Flanagan 0-1	Referee: Brendan Cawley

16 August 2025 Round 1	Johnstownbridge	1-14 (17) – (17) 1-14	Celbridge	Newbridge
14:00		(HT: 0-3 - 0-10)		Venue: Manguard Park
	Pts: Conor Flynn 1-1, Aaron McNally 0-3 (1tp), Daragh Sloane 0-3 (1tp), Sam Doran 0-2 (tp), Ronan Scanlon 0-2 (tp), Sean McKeon 0-1, Paul Cribbin 0-1 (f)	Report	Pts: Aaron Browne 0-5 (2f, 1'45), Fergal Conway 1-0, Niall O'Regan 0-2, Tony Archbold 0-2, Killian Browne 0-1, Dean O'Donoghue 0-1, Mick O'Grady 0-1, Kevin Flynn 0-1, Mick Konstantin 0-1	Referee: Paddy McDermott

==== Round 2 ====
23 August 2025 Round 2	Celbridge	1-13 (16) – (10) 0-10	Athy	Newbridge
14:00		(HT: 1-8 - 0-5)		Venue: Cedral St. Conleth's
	Pts: Aaron Browne 1-6 (2tp, 1f), Killian Browne 0-3, Niall O'Regan 0-1, Kevin O'Callaghan 0-1, Kevin Flynn 0-1, Tony Archbold 0-1	Report	Pts: Niall Kelly 0-4 (1tpf), Colm Moran 0-2 (1'45), Ben Purcell 0-2 (1f), Liam McGovern 0-1 (f), Conor Doyle 0-1	Referee: Frank Delaney

24 August 2025 Round 2	Clogherinkoe	1-10 (13) – (39) 4-27	Johnstownbridge	Newbridge
15:45		(HT: 1-7 - 2-9)		Venue: Cedral St. Conleth's
	Pts: Aedan Boyle 1-1, Jimmy Lynch 0-4 (1tp, 2f), Cein McMonagle 0-2 (1f), Mark Nolan 0-2 (tp), Killian Galligan 0-1		Pts: Darragh Sloane 0-11 (5tp), Sam Doran 2-5 (1tp), Paul Cribbin 1-2 (2f), Luke Ennis 1-0, Josh O'Donoghue 0-3 (1f), Eoin Sheehan 0-2 (tpf), Ronan Scanlon 0-2, Luke O'Connor 0-1, Dean Kelly 0-1	Referee: Henry Barrett

==== Round 3 ====
6 September 2025 Round 3	Johnstownbridge	1-16 (19) – (32) 3-23	Athy	Newbridge
15:30		(HT: 0-2 - 2-16)		Venue: Manguard Park
	Pts: Josh O'Donoghue 1-6 (2tpf, 1f), Sam Doran 0-5 (1tp), Ronan Scanlon 0-2, Daniel Flynn 0-2, Paul Cribben 0-1	Report	Pts: Colm Moran 3-8 (1pen, 2tpf, 1tp, 2f), Niall Kelly 0-4 (1tp), Paidi Behan 0-3 (1tp), Conor Doyle 0-3 (1tp), Barry Kelly 0-2, Ben Purcell 0-2, Sean Moore 0-1	Referee: Billy O'Connell

6 September 2025 Round 3	Clogherinkoe	1-10 (13) – (19) 1-16	Celbridge	Clane
15:30		(HT: 0-4 - 1-7)
	Pts: Andrew Nolan 1-0, Jimmy Lynch 0-3 (1f, 1tpf), Mark Nolan 0-2, Aedan Boyle 0-2, Cein McMonagle 0-1, Rian Cully 0-1, Eoghan McMonagle 0-1	Report	Pts: Paddy Brophy 1-2, Aaron Browne 0-3 (2f), Tony Archbold 0-2, Dean O'Donoghue 0-2, Fergal Conway 0-2, Kevin O'Callaghan 0-1, Kevin Flynn 0-1, Mick O'Grady 0-1, Killian Browne 0-1, Davy Hughes 0-1	Referee: Fergal Barry

=== Group B ===
Advance to Quarter-Finals Advance to Preliminary Quarter-Final

Team	Matches				Score			Pts
Team	Pld	W	D	L	For	Against	Diff	Pts
Sarsfield	3	3	0	0	75	35	+40	6
Naas	3	2	0	1	65	46	+19	4
Maynooth	3	1	1	2	50	64	-14	2
Raheens	3	0	0	3	33	78	-45	0

==== Round 1 ====
15 August 2025 Round 1	Naas	1-23 (26) – (19) 2-13	Maynooth	Newbridge
19:45		(HT: 0-13 - 1-6)		Venue: Cedral St. Conleth's
		Report		Referee: Harry Barrett

17 August 2025 Round 1	Sarsfield	4-18 (30) – (13) 2-7	Raheens	Newbridge
15:45		(HT: 1-6 - 1-5)		Venue: Cedral St. Conleth's
		Report		Referee: Kieran Harris

==== Round 2 ====
23 August 2025 Round 2	Raheens	0-8 (8) – (29) 3-20	Naas	Newbridge
17:45		(HT: 0-5 - 0-10)		Venue: Manguard Park
		Report		Referee: Fergus Devereux

24 August 2025 Round 2	Maynooth	1-9 (12) – (26) 2-20	Sarsfield	Newbridge
14:00		(HT: 0-7 - 1-9)		Venue: Cedral St. Conleth's
		Report		Referee: Billy O'Connell

==== Round 3 ====
6 September 2025 Round 3	Raheens	0-12 (12) – (19) 3-10	Maynooth	Clane
14:00
		Report		Referee: Niall Colgan

7 September 2025 Round 3	Naas	1-7 (10) – (19) 0-19	Sarsfield	Newbridge
		(HT: 1-3 - 0-13)		Venue: Cedral St. Conleth's
		Report		Referee: Conor Daly

=== Group C ===
Advance to Quarter-Finals Advance to Preliminary Quarter-Final Advance to Relegation Play-Off

Team	Matches				Score			Pts
Team	Pld	W	D	L	For	Against	Diff	Pts
Clane	3	3	0	0	81	61	+20	6
Moorefield	3	1	0	2	66	59	+7	2
Kilcock	3	1	0	2	51	59	-8	2
Allenwood	3	1	0	2	47	66	-19	2

==== Round 1 ====
16 August 2025 Round 1	Allenwood	0-15 (15) – (22) 2-16	Moorefield	Newbridge
14:00		(HT: 0-9 - 1-7)		Venue: Cedral St. Conleth's
		Report		Referee: Lee Moore

16 August 2025 Round 1	Kilcock	3-11 (20) – (24) 1-21	Clane	Newbridge
15:45		(HT: 0-9 - 1-12)		Venue: Cedral St. Conleth's
		Report		Referee: Billy O'Connell

==== Round 2 ====
22 August 2025 Round 2	Moorefield	1-17 (20) – (14) 3-5	Kilcock	Newbridge
				Venue: Manguard Park
				Referee: Alan Archbold

23 August 2025 Round 2	Clane	5-12 (27) – (17) 1-14	Allenwood	Newbridge
		(HT: 4-6 - 1-7)		Venue: Manguard Park
		Report		Referee: Damien Whelan

==== Round 3 ====
6 September 2025 Round 3	Moorefield	4-12 (24) – (30) 3-21	Clane	Newbridge
		(HT: 1-8 - 1-6)		Venue: Cedral St. Conleth's
		Report		Referee: Fergus Devereux

7 September 2025 Round 3	Kilcock	3-8 (17) – (15) 1-12	Allenwood	Clane
		(HT: 1-3 - 0-6)
		Report		Referee: Brendan Cawley

=== Group D ===
Advance to Quarter-Finals Advance to Preliminary Quarter-Final Advance to Relegation Play-Off

Team	Matches				Score			Pts
Team	Pld	W	D	L	For	Against	Diff	Pts
Caragh	3	3	0	0	61	45	+16	6
Eadestown	3	2	0	1	52	60	-8	4
Carbury	3	1	0	2	49	49	0	2
Confey	3	0	0	3	54	62	-8	0

==== Round 1 ====
16 August 2025 Round 1	Caragh	3-16 (25) – (11) 0-11	Eadestown	Newbridge
15:30		(HT: 0-9 - 0-8)		Venue: Manguard Park
		Report		Referee: Alan Lagrue

17 August 2025 Round 1	Carbury	1-16 (19) – (15) 2-9	Confey	Clane
3:30
				Referee: Damien Whelan

==== Round 2 ====
22 August 2025 Round 2	Confey	1-16 (19) – (20) 1-17	Caragh	Newbridge
		(HT: 0-8 - 0-6)		Venue: Cedral St. Conleth's
		Report		Referee: Niall Colgan

23 August 2025 Round 2	Eadestown	1-15 (18) – (15) 1-12	Carbury	Newbridge
		(HT: 1-6 - 0-5)		Venue: Cedral St. Conleth's
		Report		Referee: Brendan Cawley

==== Round 3 ====
6 September 2025 Round 3	Carbury	0-15 (15) – (16) 0-16	Caragh	Newbridge
				Venue: Manguard Park
				Referee: Kieran Harris

6 September 2025 Round 3	Eadestown	1-20 (23) – (20) 3-11	Confey	Newbridge
		(HT: 1-5 - 2-6)		Venue: Cedral St. Conleth's
		Report		Referee: Lee Moore

== Knock-out stages ==
The 1st and 2nd placed teams in Group A and B and the 1st placed teams in Group C and D qualified for the quarter-finals. The 3rd placed teams in Group A and B and the 2nd placed teams in Group C and D qualified for the preliminary quarter-finals. Quarter-final pairings were drawn with the winners of Group A and B playing the winners of the preliminary-quarter-finals, while the 2nd placed teams of Group A and B played the winners of Group C and D. The fixtures for the knock-out stages were determined on 7 September 2025.

Preliminary Quarter-Finals
Johnstownbridge	1-09
Eadestown	0-08
Maynooth	0-12
Moorefield	2-08

Quarter-Finals
Athy	3-07
Caragh	0-10
Sarsfield	2-21
Johnstownbridge	2-17
Celbridge	3-19
Moorefield	1-16
Clane	0-13
Naas	1-22

Semi-Finals
Athy	2-14
Sarsfield	2-13
Celbridge	0-13
Naas	1-20

Final
Athy	1-17
Naas	0-18

=== Preliminary quarter-finals ===
13 September 2025 Preliminary Quarter-Final 1	Maynooth	0-12 (12) – (14) 2-8	Moorefield	Newbridge
		(HT: 0-7 - 1-1)		Venue: Cedral St. Conleth's
	Pts: Paddy Maguire 0-3 (1tp), Matthew Diamond 0-2 (tp), Chris Canning 0-2, Paddy Hever 0-1, Paddy Mahoney 0-1, Fionn Ó Giollain 0-1, Paul Maguire 0-1, Neil Flynn 0-1	Report	Pts: Adam Tyrell 1-2, Luke Sweeney 1-0, Evan O'Brien 0-3 (1tp), Ryan Moore 0-2 (tp), Mark Murray 0-1	Referee: Paddy McDermott

14 September 2025 Preliminary Quarter-Final 2	Johnstownbridge	1-9 (12) – (8) 0-8	Eadestown	Newbridge
		(HT: 1-7 - 0-3)		Venue: Cedral St. Conleth's
	Pts: Daniel Flynn 1-1, Paul Cribbin 0-4 (3f), Aaron McNully 0-2, Josh O'Donoghue 0-2 (1f),	Report	Pts: Niall Cummins 0-4 (2tpf), Cian Boran 0-2 (tp), Sean Hynes 0-1, Eoin Conneff 0-1	Referee: Frank Delaney

=== Quarter-finals ===
20 September 2025 Quarter-Final 1	Athy	3-7 (16) – (10) 0-10	Caragh	Newbridge
		(HT: 0-3 - 0-3)		Venue: Cedral St. Conleth's
	Pts: Kevin Feely 1-0 (pen), Colm Moran 1-0, Conor Doyle 1-0, Niall Kelly 0-3 (3f), Barry Kelly 0-2, Ben Purcel 0-1, Cian Keaveney 0-1	Report	Pts: Darragh Swords 0-8 (2tpf, 2f), Dan Lynam 0-2 (tp)	Referee: Brendan Cawley

20 September 2025 Quarter-Final 2	Clane	0-13 (13) – (25) 1-22	Naas	Newbridge
		(HT: 0-8 - 1-11)		Venue: Cedral St. Conleth's
	Pts: Brian McLoughlin 0-5 (2tpf), Shane O'Sullivan 0-5 (1tp, 2f), Sam McCormack 0-1, Adam Fanning 0-1, Hugh Prendergast 0-1	Report	Pts: Alex Beirne 0-9 (1tpf, 1tp), Darragh Kirwan 0-4 (2f), Ryan Sinkey 0-3, Kevin Cummins 1-0, Dermot Hanifin 0-3, Jack McKevitt 0-1, Elliott Beirne 0-1, Paul McDermott 0-1	Referee: Kieran Harris

21 September 2025 Quarter-Final 3	Celbridge	3-19 (31) – (19) 1-16	Moorefield	Newbridge
		(HT: 1-12 - 0-4)		Venue: Cedral St. Conleth's
	Pts: Dean O'Donoghue 3-0, Aaron Browne 0-7 (2tpf, 2f, 1'45), Fergal Conway 0-4 (1tp), Killian Browne 0-2, Kevin O'Callaghan 0-2, Kevin Flynn 0-2, Tony Archbold 0-1, Mick O'Grady 0-1	Report	Pts: Evan O'Brien 1-5 (3f, 1tpf, 1pen), Aaron Masterson 0-4 (2tp), Eoin Meehan 0-3 (1tp), Mark Murray 0-2 (tp), Kevin Murnaghan 0-1, Luke Sweeney 0-1	Referee: Conor Daly

21 September 2025 Quarter-Final 4	Sarsfield	2-21 (27) – (23) 2-17	Johnstownbridge	Newbridge
		(HT: 1-7 - 2-15)		Venue: Cedral St. Conleth's
	Pts: Barry Coffey 0-9 (2tpf, 2f), Karl Hartley 2-1 (1f), Daragh Ryans 0-3 (1tp), Callum Bolton 0-2 (1f), Shea Ryan 0-1, Daragh Conlon 0-1, Tadhg Hoey 0-1	Report	Pts: Josh O'Donoghue 0-9 (2tpf, 2tp, 1f), Daniel Flynn 2-2 (1tp), Paul Cribbin 0-3 (1tp), Aaron McNally 0-2 (tp), Joey Higgins 0-1	Referee: Henry Barrett

=== Semi-finals ===
5 October 2025 Semi-Final 1	Celbridge	0-13 (13) – (23) 1-20	Naas	Newbridge
		(HT: 0-9 - 1-8)		Venue: Cedral St. Conleth's
	Pts: Aaron Browne 0-6 (3f), Tony Archbold 0-3, John Clarke 0-1, Fergal Conway 0-1, Kevin Flynn 0-1	Report	Pts: Alex Beirne 1-7 (1tp, 1tpf, 1f), Paddy McDermott 0-3, Darragh Kirwan 0-2, Ryan Sinkey 0-2, Fintan Quinn 0-1, Paul McDermott 0-1, Kevin Cummins 0-1, Brian Stynes 0-1, Elliott Beirne 0-1	Referee: Billy O'Connell

5 October 2025 Semi-Final 2	Athy	2-14 (20) – (19) 2-13	Sarsfield	Newbridge
		(HT: 2-6 - 0-6)		Venue: Cedral St. Conleth's
	Pts: Niall Kelly 2-2 (1f), David Hyland 0-4 (2tp), Kevin Feely 0-4 (1tp), Colm Moran 0-2, Brian Maher 0-1, Ronan Kelly 0-1	Report	Pts: Callum Bolton 1-2, Barry Coffey 0-3 (3f), Cian Costigan 1-0, Shea Ryan 0-2, Ben McCormack 0-1, David Higgins 0-1, Ryan Kerney 0-1, Daragh Ryan 0-1, Karl Hartley 0-1, Ben Loakman 0-1	Referee: Paddy McDermott

=== Final ===
19 October 2025 Final	Athy	1-17 (20) – (18) 0-18	Naas	Newbridge
		(HT: 1-7 - 0-9)		Venue: Cedral St. Conleth's
	Pts: Barry Kelly 1-3, Niall Kelly 0-6 (5f), Cathal McCarron 0-3, Sean Moore 0-2, Brian Maher 0-2, Kevin Feely 0-1	Report	Pts: Alex Beirne 0-10 (2tp, 2tpf, 1f), Ryan Sinkey 0-5, Jack McKevitt 0-1, Kevin Cummins 0-1, Brian Stynes 0-1	Referee: Brendan Cawley

== Relegation play-off ==
The relegation play-off consisted of the 4th placed teams in Group C and D. The winners of the playoff retained their status as a senior level club, while the loser would be relegated to the Kildare Intermediate Football Championship.

21 September 2025 Relegation Play-Off	Allenwood	1-16 (19) – (13) 0-13	Confey	Newbridge
				Venue: Manguard Park
		Report		Referee: Alan Archbold
