= Nurney GAA =

Gaelic games club in County Kildare, Ireland

Nurney
- An Urnaí
- County: Kildare
- Colours: white and green
- Grounds: Blackditch, Nurney
- Coordinates: 53.10364°N 6.94130°W

Playing kits
Standard colours

Nurney is a Gaelic Athletic Association (GAA) club in Nurney, County Kildare, Ireland. The club won Kildare Junior Football Championship and Kildare Senior Football League Division 3 titles in 2006.

== History ==
=== Gaelic football ===
The earliest recorded history of GAA in the area goes back to the turn of the 20th century, when a club was formed in Nurney in 1912 or 1913. It lasted just 3 years, in a period that coincided with World War I. In 1915, another club was formed in the area called Kildoon. This team also lasted about 2 or 3 years.

In the early 1930s, another team was formed and played their games on the Balkinstown road in Hanley's field. After the break-up of this team in 1940, many players played with a Kildangan team and in 1942 this Kildangan team won the Junior championship by beating Cappagh in the final. In 1943, they reached the Intermediate final which they lost to Ardclough.

In 1944, Kildoon were again reformed, with a number of players returning from Kildangan. They again broke up in 1950, reforming again in 1956.

In 1964, a meeting was held to discuss the amalgamation of the Kildoon & Kildangan clubs to form Nurney GAA Club. In 1968, the new club purchased a field from the Land Commission for £800. The ownership was vested in a number of local trustees, and later in the GAA at Croke Park.

1975 saw the commencement of the GAA centre and dressing rooms, with this complex being officially opened in 1978, marked by a game between Kildare and Offaly.

The first Junior final was reached in 1980 when Nurney were beaten by 2 points in a replay to an Eadestown team. In 1982, another final was reached in which Celbridge beat Nurney by a single point. Several tournaments were won during this period, including a league title in 1980 with Nurney beating Eadestown.

In 1984, Nurney won the Junior final by beating the favourites Straffan by 13 points. That year, Nurney also beat Clogherinkoe in the final of the Jack Higgins Cup by 2 points after a replay.

Nurney were now an Intermediate side, and 1985 saw them reach the semi-final of this championship only to be beaten by Suncroft after a replay. The club continued in the Intermediate championship up to 1989 without success and in 1990 they returned to Junior ranks.

Several Nurney players have worn the white jersey of Kildare over the years, with Pat Deering winning a Leinster U-21 medal in 1972. Syl Merrins won a Leinster U-21 medal in 1983, a Leinster Junior Medal in 1989, and an O'Byrne Cup medal with the Seniors in 1989. In 2004, William Heffernan won an Leinster Under 21 title. Eddie Molloy and Seamus Deering have won All-Ireland medals with the over 40s team in 1990 and 1991. Others to represent the county have been John Conway, Pat Burke, Pat Smullen, Francis Byrne, and Darren Byrne, Patrick Hannon, Neil Houlihan and Andrew Behan. For several years, Michael Conway and William Heffernan were present on the Kildare senior football panel, helping Kildare to an All Ireland Quarter Final, Semi Final and Leinster final.

In 2006, the men's senior team won the Kildare Junior Football Championship title and Kildare Senior Football League Division 3 title beating Straffan and Grange respectively.

Nurney also won the 2014 Division 3 league title while also gaining promotion to Division 2. They beat Suncroft in the 2014 final by 0-13 to 1-6 in St Conleth's Park, Newbridge.

=== Hurling ===
Nurney were one of the first participants in the Junior B hurling championship.

=== Camogie ===
In the early days of Nurney camogie, the club was known as St Judes, a set of accounts (one page) exists for a year in the 1930s.

Margaret Deering (later Sexton) of Nurney scored 1-1 for Kildare in the Leinster Junior/Smyco Cup final victory over Meath in 1967. In 2001, Nurney Camogie Club was reformed and grew to have almost 100 members catering for girls from under 9 to under 14. In 2005, a junior camogie team entered competition for the first time in 30 years and in 2005 also Under 11 Camogie titles in both club and schools competitions. Since then a number of underage competitions have been secured including Senior Schools titles in 2009 and 2010. In 2010, the club won the Junior C Championship, Under 21 B & Minor B Championship (amalgamation with Moorefield).

=== Ladies football ===
In 2007, a ladies football club was formed - Kildangan/Nurney. The club has teams from Under 10 to Senior level. The club's senior ladies team won the Junior D Championship in 2012 and a league title in 2013. The club have been represented at county level at all grades.

=== Handball ===
Nurney is one of the few clubs where handball has been played continuously. The first alley in Nurney was erected in Kildoon, beside a road that no longer exists; joining Kildoon to Nurney via the Sweeps Lane. It is believed that the Kildoon handball alley was built in the late 1700s and local folklore has it that it was built by men involved with the United Irishmen movement and its erection was used as a front for meetings, a practice that was banned at the time. In the middle of the 1930s, a new alley was built on the Nurney end of this lane, in front of Nurney school. The building was of mass concrete and the builders were the young men of the area among whom were Tommy O'Brien, Ned Hyland, P Boland Tim Kelly and Pat Delaney Tommy O'Brien was an athlete and was a well known handballer. He represented Kildare at junior level as an individual and with Ned Hyland as his doubles partner won a number of intercounty matches.
