= 1953 All-Ireland Minor Football Championship =

Gaelic football competition

All-Ireland Champions
- Winning team: Mayo (2nd win)
- Captain: Eamon Walsh

All-Ireland Finalists
- Losing team: Clare
- Captain: Tommy Mangan

Provincial Champions
- Munster: Clare
- Leinster: Louth
- Ulster: Armagh
- Connacht: Mayo

The 1953 All-Ireland Minor Football Championship was the 22nd staging of the All-Ireland Minor Football Championship, the Gaelic Athletic Association's premier inter-county Gaelic football tournament for boys under the age of 18.

Galway entered the championship as defending champions, however, they were defeated in the Connacht Championship. On 27 September 1953, Mayo won the championship following a 2-11 to 1-6 defeat of Clare in the All-Ireland final. This was their second All-Ireland title overall and their first in fifteen championship seasons.

== Results ==
=== Connacht Minor Football Championship ===
21 June 1953 Preliminary Round	Galway	5-06 - 0-01	Leitrim	St Coman's Park, Roscommon

28 June 1953 Semi-Final	Sligo	0-05 - 2-10	Mayo	Corran Park, Ballymote

5 July 1953 Semi-Final	Galway	1-03 - 2-08	Roscommon	Tuam Stadium, Galway

19 July 1953 Final	Roscommon	1-03 - 1-09	Mayo	St Coman's Park, Roscommon

=== Munster Minor Football Championship ===
19 July 1953 Final	Clare	0-07 - 0-02	Cork	Fitzgerald Stadium, Killarney

=== Leinster Minor Football Championship ===
26 July 1953 Final	Louth	1–06 - 0–06	Kildare	Croke Park, Dublin
	P. McMahon 1-1, J. Reynolds 0-2, B. McDonald, P. Hallinan, O. Judge 0-1 each		S. Aldridge 0-3, S. Harrison 0-2, W. Ryan 0-1	Referee: W. O'Connor (Carlow)

GK	1	Seán Óg Flood (Dundalk Young Irelands)
RCB	2	Tom McArdle (Clan na Gael)
FB	3	Ken Smyth (Kilsaran)
LCB	4	Patsy McEntee (St Dominic's)
RHB	5	Patsy Coleman (St Mary's)
CHB	6	John McArdle (Clan na Gael) (c)
LHB	7	Eamon McGrath (Cooley Kickhams)
MF	8	Paddy Hallinan (St Dominic's)
MF	9	Oliver Judge (Oliver Plunketts)
RHF	10	Brendan Kierans (Oliver Plunketts)
CHF	11	Jackie Reynolds (Lourdes Rangers)
LHF	12	Jim Judge (Oliver Plunketts)
RCF	13	Frank Murphy (Lourdes Rangers)
FF	14	Patrick McMahon (Dowdallshill)
LCF	15	Brian McDonald (Dundalk Young Irelands)

GK	1	S. Kelly (Round Towers)
RCB	2	P. Loughlin (Round Towers)
FB	3	F. McGinty (Carbury)
LCB	4	S. Mullally (Athgarvan)
RHB	5	F. Mooney (Sarsfields)
CHB	6	J. Daly (Naas)
LHB	7	J. Dowling (Moorefield)
MF	8	M. Carroll (Kildangan)
MF	9	T. Halligan (Athy)
RHF	10	E. Hogan (Naas) (c)
CHF	11	S. Aldridge (Round Towers)
LHF	12	T. Martin (Rathangan)
RCF	13	S. Harrison (Kildangan)
FF	14	D. Kane (Naas)
LCF	15	W. Ryan (Athy)

=== Ulster Minor Football Championship ===
26 July 1953 Final	Armagh	2-15 - 3-02	Tyrone	Casement Park, Belfast

=== All-Ireland Minor Football Championship ===
Semi-finals

23 August 1953	Clare	1-10 - 0-02	Louth	Croke Park, Dublin

30 August 1953	Mayo	5-02 - 1-05	Armagh	Pearse Park, Longford

Final

27 September 1953	Mayo	2-11 - 1-06	Clare	Croke Park, Dublin
				Referee: D. King (Down)

== Championship statistics ==
=== Miscellaneous ===
- Clare win the Munster Championship for the first time since 1930.
