= Kill GAA (County Kildare) =

Sports club

Kill
- An Chill
- County: Kildare
- Nickname: "The Jungle"
- Colours: Green and Gold
- Grounds: Greenhills, Kill
- Coordinates: 53.24398°N 6.598792°W

Playing kits
Standard colours

Senior Club Championships
	All Ireland	Leinster champions	Kildare champions
Football:	-	-	-
Hurling:	-	-	-
Ladies' football:	-	-	-
Camogie:	-	-	1

Kill GAA (An Chill GAA) is a Gaelic Athletic Association club in Kill, County Kildare, Ireland. They combined with Ardclough to form area side Wolfe Tones in the 1970s. A recent amalgamation with Sallins has created Wolfe Tones hurling club, which has since been competing in the lower divisions of hurling in Kildare.

== History ==
RIC records from 1890 show that Kilteel King O'Tooles club had 30 members with officers listed as John Lennon, John Buggle, William Walsh and William Dowling.

== Gaelic Football ==
Kill won the Junior A & B Championship on the same day in 1992, and won the Higgins Cup final against Eadestown. As a result, Kill was named 1992 Kildare Club Of The Year. In Intermediate ranks the following year they lost to Rathcoffey in the Northern final. They maintained their Intermediate status since 1993, having close calls in 2012 (v. Straffan), 2013 (v. Kilcullen) 2014 (v. Robertstown) & 2015 (v. Caragh) where they won all four relegation finals in a row, before finally being relegated in the Junior championship in 2019 against Ellistown.

In the 1962 Kildare Senior Football Championship Kill reached the semi-final stage, their best finish to date. Olly Harrington scored their goal as they went down to Kilcullen, 1-7 to 1-5. Area side Wolfe Tones qualified for the 1971 senior football semi-final and a three-point defeat to Carbury. The current players have improved greatly over the last few years, but have been suffering dearly at the hands of bigger clubs in recent history.

== Hurling ==
Kill hurlers began contesting the Junior Championship in the 1950s. They won the Division 3 Hurling League in 2001, followed by the Division 2 Hurling league in 2002.

Kill also contested the Junior championship finals of 2002, 2003, 2004, before finally winning it in 2005 with a last second goal by Brian McMahon, winning by a point over Leixlip. They followed this by reaching the Intermediate Championship Final in 2006, losing narrowly to Ardclough. By reaching the Intermediate final, they then went on to represent Kildare in the 2006 Leinster Junior Club Hurling Championship against Our Lady's Island from Wexford. More silverware followed in 2011, when they again went on to win the Intermediate B Championship by one point, beating Confey's second team on a scoreline of 1-8 to 2-6.

Kill amalginated with Ardclough to form Killard for minor in 2008, winning the 2008 Kildare Minor 'A' Hurling Championship beating Naas in Leixlip 0-12 to 0-8. Also winning the Kildare under 16 'B' in 2009 beating Maynooth in Clane.

== Camogie ==
Kill Camogie team have the club's sole Senior Championship title, winning the 1957 championship. They completed a league & championship double in 2018, winning the Division 2 League final versus Cappagh GAA & Intermediate Championship final versus a Rathcoffey/Straffan amalgamation.

Kill hosted the 1939 Leinster final in a field behind the church where the dual carriageway now runs.

== Honours ==
Champions

- 1957 Camogie Senior Championship
- 2018 Camogie Intermediate Camogie Championship
- 2018 Camogie Senior Division 2 League Champions
- 2017 Camogie Junior League 2 Champions
- 2009 Camogie Junior B Champions
- 2008 Camogie Junior B Champions
- 1960, 1979, 1992 Football Junior A Championship
- 1992 Football Junior B Championship
- 2007 Football Div. 3 Champions
- 2018 LGFA Junior Championship
- 2011 Hurling Intermediate B Hurling Championship
- 2005 Hurling Junior Championship (1)
- 2021 Football Reserve League Div. 5 Champions
- 2021 Football Reserve E Football Championship Champions

== Bibliography ==
- Kildare GAA: A Centenary History, by Eoghan Corry, CLG Chill Dara, 1984, ISBN 0-9509370-0-2 hb ISBN 0-9509370-1-0 pb
- Kildare GAA yearbook, 1972, 1974, 1978, 1979, 1980 and 2000- in sequence especially the Millennium yearbook of 2000
- Soaring Sliothars: Centenary of Kildare Camogie 1904-2004 by Joan O'Flynn Kildare County Camogie Board.
