= Kildare Junior Football Championship =

Annual Gaelic football competition

The Kildare Junior Football Championship is an annual Gaelic football competition contested by lower-tier Kildare GAA clubs. The winning club plays in the Kildare Intermediate Football Championship in the following year. As of the 2022 season there is an overall Junior Championship winner as well as a Junior A winner (competed for between the bottom four teams in the Junior Championship Round Robin Group 2). There have been various iterations of the competition, which started in 1906 as the secondary competition to the Kildare Senior Football Championship. In 1928 a Kildare Intermediate Football Championship was started for middle tier teams with the Junior Championship ranking below that. In 1947 the Junior Championship was split into A and B competitions with the winners competing for the overall Junior title. They played for a trophy called the Jack Higgins Cup, named after the former Kildare and Naas great. Reserve teams were allowed to enter the Junior Championship at various stages up until recent years but a Reserve Championship has since been instigated. The Jack Higgins Trophy has not been played since 2019 due to the covid pandemic. The Junior winners receive the Noel Moran Cup, named after the former Kilcock and Kildare player.

== Qualification for subsequent competitions ==
=== Leinster Junior Club Football Championship ===
The Kildare JFC winners qualify for the Leinster Junior Club Football Championship. It is the only team from County Kildare to qualify for this competition. The Kildare JFC winners enter the Leinster Junior Club Football Championship at the __ stage.

=== All-Ireland Junior Club Football Championship ===
The Kildare JFC winners — by winning the Leinster Junior Club Football Championship — may qualify for the All-Ireland Junior Club Football Championship, at which they would enter at the __ stage, providing they haven't been drawn to face the British champions in the quarter-finals.

For example, Two Mile House, the 2013 winners, went on to win the All-Ireland Football Championship title at Croke Park. In an unprecedented occurrence, Sunday Mass was moved to accommodate the game.

== Wins listed by club ==
| # | Team | Wins | Years won |
|---|---|---|---|
| 1 | Kilcullen | 7 | 1914, 1943, 1953, 1971, 1997, 2016, 2021 |
| 2 | Caragh | 5 | 1917, 1949, 1993, 2010, 2020 |
| 2 | Straffan | 5 | 1946, 1964, 2009, 2014, 2022 |
| 4 | Monasterevin | 4 | 1906, 1910, 1935, 1954 |
| 4 | Celbridge | 4 | 1923, 1936, 1958, 1986 |
| 4 | Robertstown | 4 | 1934, 1939, 1989, 2011 |
| 4 | Ardclough | 4 | 1941, 1959, 1968, 2000 |
| 4 | Milltown | 4 | 1944, 2008, 2018, 2023 |
| 4 | Ballymore Eustace | 4 | 1951, 1985, 2017, 2019 |
| 4 | Clogherinkoe | 4 | 1963, 1984, 1998, 2012 |
| 4 | Grangenolvin | 4 | 1965, 1987, 2005, 2025 |
| 12 | Maddenstown | 3 | 1908, 1918, 1925 |
| 12 | Maynooth | 3 | 1912, 1947, 1995 |
| 12 | Naas | 3 | 1913, 1919, 1981 |
| 12 | Eadestown | 3 | 1915, 1982, 1991 |
| 12 | Rathangan | 3 | 1920, 1938, 1970 |
| 12 | Suncroft | 3 | 1930, 1962, 1977 |
| 12 | Moorefield | 3 | 1932, 1948, 2002 |
| 12 | Rheban | 3 | 1940, 1969, 1996 |
| 12 | Rathcoffey | 3 | 1945, 1955, 1990 |
| 12 | Castledermot | 3 | 1957, 1979, 2004 |
| 12 | Sallins | 3 | 1966, 1973, 2001 |
| 12 | Ellistown | 3 | 1922, 1999, 2024 |
| 23 | Kilcock | 2 | 1937, 1950 |
| 23 | Athgarvan | 2 | 1927, 1956 |
| 23 | Johnstownbridge | 2 | 1967, 1975 |
| 23 | Leixlip | 2 | 1952, 1980 |
| 23 | Ballyteague | 2 | 1972, 1988 |
| 23 | Kill | 2 | 1960, 1992 |
| 23 | Ballykelly | 2 | 1974, 2007 |
| 23 | Two Mile House | 2 | 1994, 2013 |
| 23 | Castlemitchel | 2 | 1983, 2015 |
| 23 | St Kevins | 2 | 1976, 2026 |
| 33 | Athy | 1 | 1907 |
| 33 | Round Towers | 1 | 1911 |
| 33 | Blacktrench | 1 | 1916 |
| 33 | Kildare | 1 | 1921 |
| 33 | Carbury | 1 | 1926 |
| 33 | Raheens | 1 | 1928 |
| 33 | Clane | 1 | 1929 |
| 33 | Newbridge | 1 | 1931 |
| 33 | Kildangan | 1 | 1942 |
| 33 | Allenwood | 1 | 1961 |
| 33 | St Laurences | 1 | 1978 |
| 33 | Confey | 1 | 2003 |
| 33 | Nurney | 1 | 2006 |

== Junior and Jack Higgins Cup Finals listed by year ==
Note: Listed in the "JFC Winner" column is the team who won the primary Junior competition each year. Generally this was the "Junior A" competition when there were A, B, C, etc., competitions but in more recent years there was just one Junior grouping. In 2022 the Junior Championship was split between Groups 1 and 2 on a seeded basis with Group 2 consisting of weaker teams. The bottom four teams in that Group 2 played off for a new "Junior A" championship which was won by Rheban who beat Castlemitchell in the final by 2-7 to 0-9. A new, as yet unnamed trophy was presented to the winners.

| Year | JFC Winner | Score | Opponent | Score | Jack Higgins Winner | Score | Opponent | Score |
|---|---|---|---|---|---|---|---|---|
| 2026 | St. Kevin's | 4-09 | Cappagh | 1-15 | | | | |
| 2025 | Grangenolvin | 0-18 | Rathcoffey | 2-07 | | | | |
| 2024 | Ellistown | 2-08 | Kill | 1-09 | | | | |
| 2023 | Milltown | 1-17 | Robertstown | 1-06 | | | | |
| 2022 | Straffan | 2-15 | Kill | 0-13 | | | | |
| 2021 | Kilcullen | 2-10 | Rathcoffey | 1-04 | | | | |
| 2020 * | Caragh | 0-11 | Robertstown | 0-06 | | | | |
| 2019 | Ballymore Eustace | 3-12 | Robertstown | 0-08 | Ballymore Eustace | 3-20 | Sarsfields | 3-12 |
| 2018 | Milltown | 1-14 | Rheban | 1-10 | Naas | 3-15 | Milltown | 1-5 |
| 2017 | Ballymore Eustace | 3-18 | Caragh | 1-04 | Ballymore Eustace | 2-13 | Sarsfields | 0-13 |
| 2016 | Kilcullen | 0-07, R 2-14 | Milltown | 0-07, R 0-13 | Moorefield | 2-10 | Kilcullen | 1-05 |
| 2015 | Castlemitchell | 1-11 | Cappagh | 0-07 | Sarsfields | | Castlemitchell | |
| 2014 | Straffan | 2-12 | Castlemitchell | 0-06 | | | | |
| 2013 | Two Mile House | 0-15 | Straffan | 0-13 | | | | |
| 2012 | Clogherinkoe | 2-10 | Two Mile House | 2-08 | Moorefield | 1-10 | Clogherinkoe | 0-09 |
| 2011 | Robertstown | 2-10 | Two Mile House | 2-07 | | | | |
| 2010 | Caragh | 0-08 | Robertstown | 1-04 | | | | |
| 2009 | Straffan | 1-11 | Two Mile House | 0-13 | Sarsfields | 1-12 | Straffan | 0-09 |
| 2008 | Milltown | 0-14 | Robertstown | 1-10 | | | | |
| 2007 | Ballykelly | 2-10 | Two Mile House | 0-10 | Ballykelly | 2-08 | Maynooth | 0-07 |
| 2006 | Nurney | 1-14 | Straffan | 1-13 | Moorefield | 2-06 | Nurney | 0-09 |
| 2005 | Grangenolvin | 1-12 | Robertstown | 3-05 | | | | |
| 2004 | Castledermot | 2-14 | Robertstown | 1-10 | Castledermot | | Milltown | |
| 2003 | Confey | 1-13 | Nurney | 0-05 | Confey | | Robertstown | |
| 2002 | Moorefield | 2-08 | Leixlip | 0-12 | Nurney | 1-11 | Moorefield | 0-11 |
| 2001 | Sallins | 2-16 | Confey | 2-08 | Sallins | 0-10 | Straffan | 0-06 |
| 2000 | Ardclough | 0-10 | Milltown | 0-06 | Ardclough | 3-10 | Ballykelly | 2-07 |
| 1999 | Ellistown | 4-03 | Ardclough | 0-09 | | | | |
| 1998 | Clogherinkoe | 1-10 | Ardclough | 0-08 | Clogherinkoe | | Maynooth | |
| 1997 | Kilcullen | 0-14 | Ellistown | 1-05 | Kilcullen | 2-11 | Moorefield | 3-07 |
| 1996 | Rheban | 0-11 | Kilcullen | 1-06 | Rheban | 0-10 | Carbury | 0-03 |
| 1995 | Maynooth | 0-13 | Kilcullen | 0-10 | Moorefield | 2-08 | Maynooth | 1-07 |
| 1994 | Two Mile House | 2-08 | Maynooth | 0-08 | Sarsfields | 3-04 | Two Mile House | 0-07 |
| 1993 | Caragh | 2-11 | Ellistown | 1-08 | Caragh | 1-08 | Moorefield | 1-02 |
| 1992 | Kill | 0-11 | Kilcullen | 0-08 | Kill | 0-11 | Allenwood | 1-06 |
| 1991 | Eadestown | 1-09 | Kilcullen | 0-07 | Eadestown | 1-03 | Sarsfields | 0-04 |
| 1990 | Rathcoffey | 1-09 | Eadestown | 0-09 | Naas | 0-10 | Rathcoffey | 1-05 |
| 1989 | Robertstown | 0-06 1-08 (R) | Rheban | 0-06 0-09 (R) | Robertstown | 1-09 | Naas | 1-06 |
| 1988 | Ballyteague | 4-08 | Kill | 0-08 | Ballyteague | 0-06 | Carbury | 0-03 |
| 1987 | Grangenolvin | 2-04 | Ballyteague | 0-07 | Grangenolvin | 2-06 | Round Towers | 0-04 |
| 1986 | Celbridge | 0-15 | Robertstown | 0-05 | Celbridge | 0-13 | Straffan | 0-04 |
| 1985 | Ballymore Eustace | 1-11 | Ballyteague | 2-07 | Sarsfields | 1-11 (R) | Grangenolvin | 0-07 (R) |
| 1984 | Clogherinkoe | 1-09 3-09 (R) | Milltown | 0-12 1-07 (R) | Nurney | 0-08 2-08 (R) | Clogherinkoe | 1-05 1-07 (R) |
| 1983 | Castlemitchel | 3-08 | Ardclough | 1-08 | Castlemitchel | 0-08 | Robertstown | 0-06 |
| 1982 | Eadestown | 0-09 2-09 (R) | Ballymore Eustace | 1-12 1-07 (R) | Eadestown | 1-11 | Celbridge | 1-05 |
| 1981 | Naas | 5-06 | Eadestown | 1-12 | Kilcock | 2-07 | Naas | 2-06 |
| 1980 | Leixlip | 1-08 | Kill | 1-05 | Leixlip | 5-06 | Eadestown | 1-13 |
| 1979 | Castledermot | 1-06 | Leixlip | 0-08 | Castledermot | 2-06 | Kill | 2-04 |
| 1978 | St. Laurence's | 4-12 | Ballymore Eustace | 1-04 | Clongorey | 4-04 | St. Laurence's | 2-03 |
| 1977 | Suncroft | 1-08 | St. Laurence's | 0-07 | Suncroft | 3-08 | Clogherinkoe | 1-06 |
| 1976 | St. Kevin's | 1-08 0-11 (R) | Leixlip | 1-08 0-04 | Maynooth | 1-09 | St. Kevin's | 2-04 |
| 1975 | Johnstownbridge | 4-16 | Suncroft | 0-05 | Johnstownbridge | 2-08 | St. Laurence's | 1-04 |
| 1974 | Ballykelly | 1-09 | Johnstownbridge | 1-07 | Raheens | 1-05 | Ballykelly | 0-06 |
| 1973 | Sallins | 1-12 | Castledermot | 1-09 | Sallins | 1-12 | Castledermot | 1-09 |
| 1972 | Ballyteague | 2-10 | Castlemitchel | 0-06 | Ballyteague | 2-09 | St. Kevin's | 2-04 |
| 1971 | Kilcullen | 2-09 2-04 (R) | Ballyteague | 2-09 1-06 (R) | Kilcullen | 1-14 | Sallins | 0-04 |
| 1970 | Rathangan | 1-06 0-11 (R) | Rathcoffey | 1-06 0-09 (R) | Rathangan | 0-16 | Kilcullen | 1-07 |
| 1969 | Rheban | 2-14 | Castledermot | 2-02 | Rheban | 2-09 | Kilcullen | 1-07 |
| 1968 | Ardclough | 0-14 | Ballyteague | 1-09 | Ardclough | 0-14 | Ballymore Eustace | 1-09 |
| 1967 | Johnstownbridge | 2-09 | Rheban | 2-07 | Milltown | 5-07 | Johnstownbridge | 2-08 |
| 1966 | Sallins | 2-06 0-08 (R) | Ardclough | 0-12 0-05 (R) | Sallins | 1-10 | Johnstownbridge | 0-08 |
| 1965 | Grangenolvin | 1-05 2-08 (R) | Rheban | 0-08 1-03 (R) | Grangenolvin | 1-07 | Sallins | 0-05 |
| 1964 | Straffan | 3-11 | Rheban | 0-06 | Straffan | bt | Grangenolvin | |
| 1963 | Clogherinkoe | 0-12 | Straffan | 0-10 | Ellistown | 0-08 | Clogherinkoe | 0-06 |
| 1962 | Suncroft | bt | Ardclough | | Suncroft | 1-06 2-03 (R) | Ballyteague | 1-06 1-02 (R) |
| 1961 | Allenwood | 1-10 | Rheban | 1-05 | Allenwood | 2-04 | Carbury | 1-03 |
| 1960 | Kill | 2-09 | Carbury | 1-07 | Eadestown | 0-11 | Kill | 1-05 |
| 1959 | Ardclough | 0-05 3-06 (R) | Rheban | 1-02 0-06 (R) | Ardclough | 3-06 | Straffan | 1-04 |
| 1958 | Celbridge **** | 1-05 | Moone | 2-07 | Celbridge | 1-06 | Clongorey | 1-01 |
| 1957 | Castledermot | 2-07 | Kill | 0-07 | Castledermot | 5-09 | Clogherinkoe | 1-01 |
| 1956 | Athgarvan | bt | Kill | | Athgarvan | 2-05 | Castledermot | 0-08 |
| 1955 | Rathcoffey | bt | Rheban | | Rathcoffey | 1-07 | Milltown | 1-06 |
| 1954 | Monasterevin | 0-08 | Ballykelly | 0-07 | Monasterevin | 4-09 | Rathcoffey | 0-05 |
| 1953 | Kilcullen | 1-05 | Moone | 0-02 | Kilcullen | 1-07 | Ballykelly | 1-04 |
| 1952 | Leixlip | 4-04 | Athgarvan | 0-08 | Naas | 3-03 | Leixlip | 1-03 |
| 1951 | Ballymore Eustace | 4-09 | Kilcullen | 0-02 | Ballymore Eustace | 4-09 | Kilcullen | 0-02 |
| 1950 | Kilcock | 2-05 | Monasterevan | 1-02 | Kilcock | 1-02 | Johnstownbridge | 0-02 |
| 1949 | Caragh | 2-09 | Athy | 0-04 | Caragh | 4-09 | Ballymore Eustace | 2-07 |
| 1948 | Moorefield | 1-05 | Caragh | 1-03 | Moorefield | 1-04 2-06 (R) | Athy | 1-04 2-02 (R) |
| 1947 | Maynooth | 0-01 0-06 (R) | Robertstown | 0-01 0-02 (R) | Maynooth | 7-09 | Narraghmore | 1-02 |
| 1946 | Straffan | 1-04 | Kildangan | 0-04 | | | | |
| 1945 | Rathcoffey | 3-07 | Monasterevan | 1-00 | | | | |
| 1944 | Milltown | 0-09 | Carbury | 0-01 | | | | |
| 1943 | Kilcullen | 1-04 | Castlemitchel | 0-03 | | | | |
| 1942 | Kildangan | 2-03 | Cappagh | 0-04 | | | | |
| 1941 | Ardclough | 1-05 | Kildangan | 2-01 | | | | |
| 1940 | Rheban | 0-04 0-08 (R) | Ardclough | 0-04 1-01 (R) | | | | |
| 1939 | Robertstown | 6-02 | Rheban | 1-04 | | | | |
| 1938 | Rathangan | 2-02 | Ardclough | 2-01 | | | | |
| 1937 | Kilcock | 1-08 | Rheban | 0-03 | | | | |
| 1936 | Celbridge | 3-06 | Kildangan | 1-02 | | | | |
| 1935 | Monasterevin | bt | Moorefield | by 1 pt | | | | |
| 1934 | Robertstown | 3-03 | Maynooth | 0-03 | | | | |
| 1933 | Roseberry | 1-03 5-10 (R) | Robertstown | 1-03 1-03 (R) | | | | |
| 1932 | Moorefield | 1-09 | Celbridge | 2-04 | | | | |
| 1931 | Newbridge | 1-04 | Monasterevin | 0-02 | | | | |
| 1930 | Suncroft | 1-05 | Celbridge | 0-02 | | | | |
| 1929 | Clane | 2-05 | Eleventh Batt. | 2-02 | | | | |
| 1928 | Raheens | 1-08 | Celbridge | 0-03 | | | | |
| 1927 | Athgarvan | 1-03 2-02 (R) | Newbridge | 1-03 1-02 (R) | | | | |
| 1926 | Carbury | 2-04 | Roseberry | 1-05 | | | | |
| 1925 | Maddenstown | 2-04 | Carbury | 0-02 | | | | |
| 1924 | Roseberry | 2-02 | Leixlip | 1-01 | | | | |
| 1923 | Celbridge | 3-05 | Milltown | 1-01 | | | | |
| 1922 | Ellistown | bt | Celbridge | | | | | |
| 1921 | Kildare | 2-03 | Naas | 2-01 | | | | |
| 1920 | Rathangan | 2-04 | Robertstown | 0-04 | | | | |
| 1919 | Naas | 1-04 | Rathangan | 1-03 | | | | |
| 1918 | Maddenstown | 0-03 2-03 (R) | Leixlip | 0-03 2-01 (R) | | | | |
| 1917 | Caragh | 1-02 1-02 (R) 2-03 (2R) | Maddenstown | 0-05 1-02 (R) 1-03 (2R) | | | | |
| 1916 | Blacktrench | 1-06 | Rathangan | 1-05 | | | | |
| 1915 | Eadestown | 1-02 | Castledermot | 0-01 | | | | |
| 1914 | Kilcullen | 2-03 | Ballymore Eustace | 1-02 | | | | |
| 1913 | Naas | 3-01 | Athy | 1-03 | | | | |
| 1912 | Maynooth | 3-03 | Castledermot | 1-02 | | | | |
| 1911 | Round Towers | 0-06 | Eyrefield | 1-00 | | | | |
| 1910*** | Monasterevin | 3-02 | Roseberry | 0-02 | | | | |
| 1909 | Cancelled | | | | | | | |
| 1908** | Maddenstown | 0-09 | Rathmore | 1-03 | | | | |
| 1907* | Athy | 1-04 | Caragh | 0-07 | | | | |
| 1906 | Monasterevin | 2-13 | Carbury | 0-02 | | | | |

- 2020 final (played in July 2021 due to the impact of the COVID-19 pandemic on Gaelic games)
- * No record of replay for the 1907 title. Original match played on Feb 14 '09 but neither team turned up for replay on March 14
- ** Maddenstown and Rathmore played 5 times in all with the other four scorelines being 0-7 to 0-1, 0-6 to 0-5, 0-7 to 1-4 and 0-7 to 0-6. Three objections and the one draw caused the replays. Games were played July 11 '90, Aug 1 '09, Sep 2 '09, Oct 10 '09 and Oct 31 '09.
- *** Objection led to a replay after Monasterevan won first game by a point
- **** Celbridge won the 1958 JFC A Final on an objection after Moone fielded an ineligible player from nearby Barronstown, just over the Wicklow border
