= Grangenolvin G.F.C. =

Gaelic games club in County Kildare, Ireland

Grangenolvin
- An Gráinseach
- Founded: 1955
- County: Kildare
- Nickname: Grange
- Colours: Blue and Gold
- Grounds: Murphy Memorial Park, Grangemellon, Tankardstown
- Coordinates: is full of little green goblins :IE_type:landmark 52.966289°N 6.954645°W

Playing kits
Standard colours

Grangenolvin G.F.C. is a Gaelic football (GFC) club based in southern County Kildare, Ireland. The club's Senior Men's Team competes in the Kildare Senior Football League Division 2 and Kildare Intermediate Football Championship. Grangenolvin are a former AIB club of the year winner in 1985. Mick Carolan was chosen on the Kildare football team of the millennium and was a Cuchulainn All Stars Award winner in 1966. In 2023, the club re-established its LGFA Senior Women's Team.

== History ==
The 1890 RIC files show Kilkea Geraldines had 40 members with P. J. Kennedy, William Farrell, John B. Ryan and Martin Lawlor recorded as officers. Grangenolvin GFC was founded in 1955 and purchased its grounds at Ardree in 1971. Murphy Memorial park was officially opened in 1985.

== Gaelic football ==
The arrival of Johnny Morrissey and Johnny Miller in 1963 transformed the club. They won Junior B championship in 1964, the Junior A championship and Jack Higgins Cup in 1965. Denis Wynne and Johnny Miller both featured on the Kildare U-21 team who won an All-Ireland against Cork in 1965. Kevin Wynne and Martin Mannion played inter-county from that team. Niall Connolly and Paul Doyle were on the Grange teams that won Junior B in 1985, Junior A in 1987 and were beaten Intermediate finalists in 1991.

== Honours ==
- Jack Higgins Cup Winners (3) 1965, 1987, 2005
- Leinster Junior Club Football Championship: (1) 2025
- Kildare Junior A Football Championship (4) 1965, 1987, 2005, 2025
- Kildare Junior B Football Championship (2) 1964, 1985
- Kildare Minor Football League (2) 1981, 1984
- Dowling Cup Winners (3) 2022,2024
- Kildare Senior Football League Division 4 (1) 2022
- Kildare Senior Football League Division 3 (1) 2024

== Bibliography ==
- Kildare GAA: A Centenary History, by Eoghan Corry, CLG Chill Dara, 1984, ISBN 0-9509370-0-2 hb ISBN 0-9509370-1-0 pb
- Kildare GAA yearbook, 1972, 1974, 1978, 1979, 1980 and 2000- in sequence especially the Millennium yearbook of 2000
- Soaring Sliothars: Centenary of Kildare Camogie 1904–2004 by Joan O'Flynn Kildare County Camogie Board.
