= Kill GAA =

Kill GAA may refer to:

- Kill GAA (County Kildare), a sports club in Kill, County Kildare
- Kill GAA (County Waterford), a sports club in Kill, County Waterford
