= Robertstown, County Kildare =

Village in County Kildare, Ireland

Robertstown Irish: Baile Riobaird
- Village
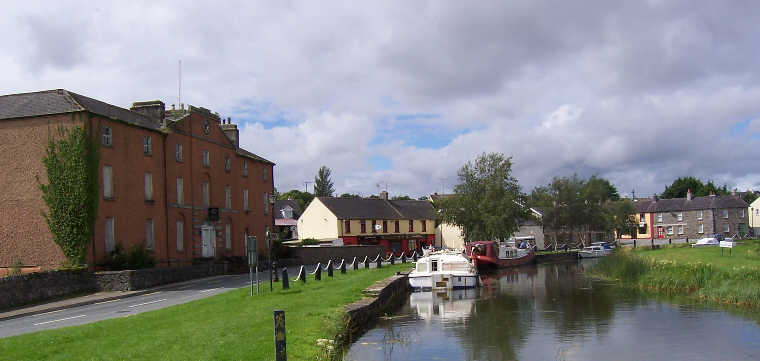
- Robertstown and the Grand Canal and Hotel

- Location in Ireland
- Coordinates: 53°16′14″N 6°49′00″W
- Country: Ireland
- Province: Leinster
- County: County Kildare
- Elevation: 85 m (279 ft)

Population (2016)
  - Total: 707
- Time zone: UTC+0 (WET)
  - Summer (DST): UTC-1 (IST (WEST))
- Irish Grid Reference: N786252

Robertstown (Irish: Baile Riobaird) is a village on the banks of the Grand Canal in County Kildare, Ireland, 12 km north west of Naas. It grew in importance on the arrival of the canal, at the highest level (85 metres (279 ft) above sea level) of which it lies, in 1784.

== History ==
Robertstown was a planned village, set along the canal featuring a prominent hotel and bridge with a small row of cottages and a shop.

== Grand Canal Hotel ==
In 1801 the Grand Canal Hotel was officially opened to cater for the passenger traffic along the canal and an extension was added in 1804. For a time business was good, with the canal carrying 100,000 passengers per year, but revenues began to fall and gradually the 72 windows and 62 hearths were closed up to avoid paying tax. It ceased being a hotel in 1849, was used as a barracks for the Irish Constabulary between 1869 and 1905, headed up by Royal Chief Constabul James Pius Percival, who helped fund the building of local estate Fr Murphy Park in 1915, and was later used as a community centre. As of 2002, the building was in use as a museum/gallery.

== Modern times ==
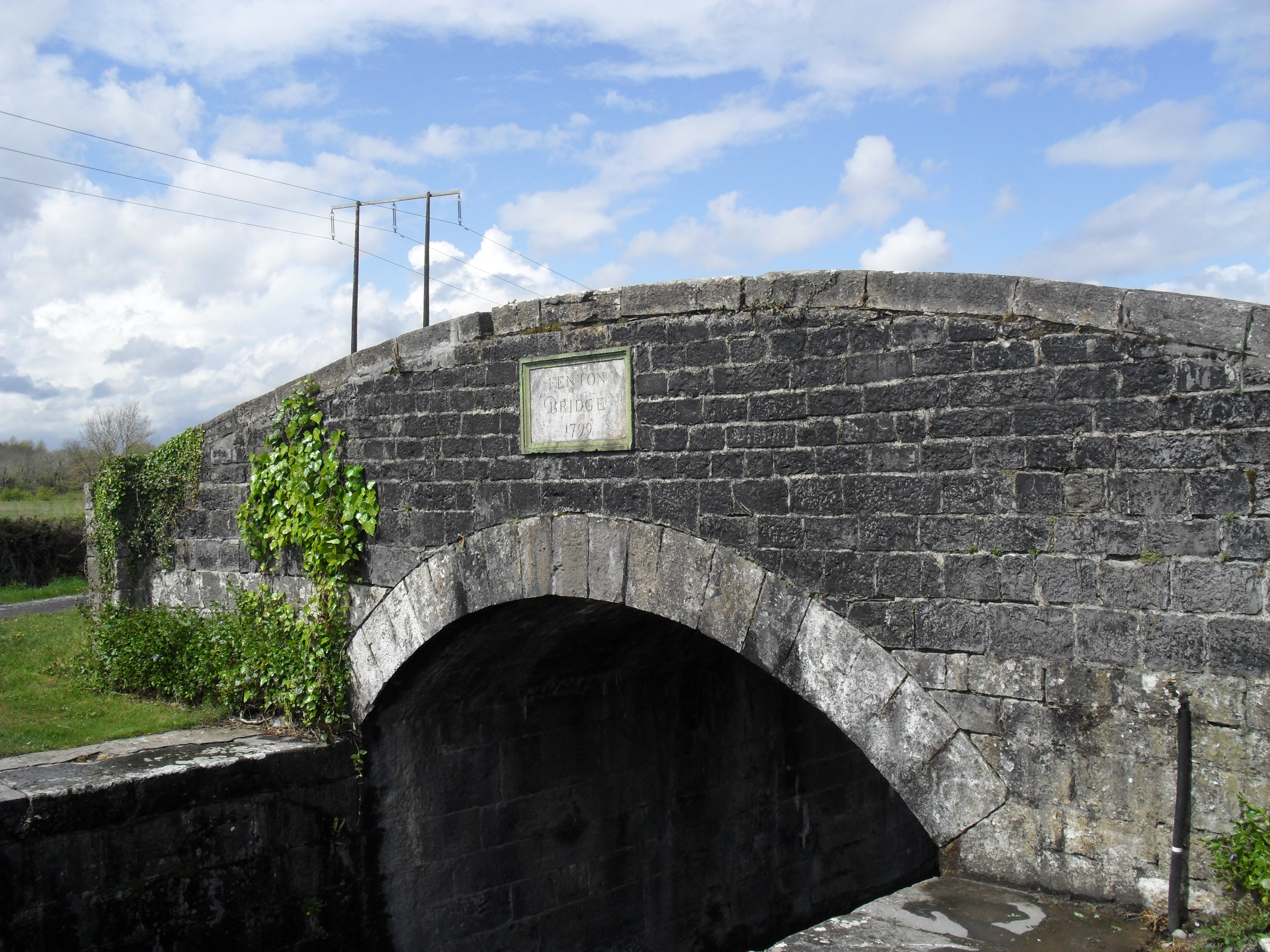
Fenton Bridge over the Grand Canal in Robertstown.

There were once three public houses in the village and two supermarkets but now due to an economic decline in the industry, only one public house remains open and active. Developments include a set of canal-side cottages, and Lowtown Marina, with boats for sale and other services. The town caters for tourism with canal walks, fishing and an annual vintage fair which takes place in June every year.

A local group, Robertstown Community Amenities Association (RTG Ltd.) was formed in 2008 with the aim to build a community centre on lands promised, with an added grant of €500,000, to the community by Failte Ireland when the hotel was sold to a private buyer. A canal barge, 52M Eustace, was also to be transferred.

== Wildlife ==
Ducks, swans and herons, fish such as pike, barracuda, bream, tench, roach and stickleback, and mammals such as pygmy shrew, stoat, and brown rat, are all observed locally.

== Demographics ==
The population of Robertstown more than tripled (from 206 to 707 inhabitants) in the 20 years between the 1996 and 2016 census. As of the 2002 census, Robertstown had a population of 375, growing (by 65.6%) to 621 in 2006, and to 669 by the time of the 2011 census. The 2016 census recorded a population of 707.

== Sport ==
Robertstown GAA is based in Maurice Musgrave Park in Robertstown. There is also a soccer team, Bridgewood FC, 3-time winners of the Lumsden Cup.

== See also ==
- List of towns and villages in Ireland
