= St Edward's GAA =

Gaelic games club in County Kildare, Ireland

St Edward’s U12 - U23
- Naomh Éadbhaird
- County: Kildare
- Nickname: Eddies
- Colours: Royal Blue & white
- Grounds: Rathcoffey GAA; Straffan GAA founded = 1986

Playing kits
Standard colours

St Edward's Gaelic Athletic Association (GAA) is an amalgamation consisting of Rathcoffey GAA and Straffan GAA clubs for the purposes of fielding juvenile football teams. St Edward's fields teams with Rathcoffey and Straffan GAA at official age groups from Under 12 up to Under 23.
