= Ellistown GFC =

Ellistown
- Baile Eilís
- Founded: 1888
- County: Kildare
- Colours: Blue and yellow
- Grounds: Ellistown, Rathangan
- Coordinates: 53.184870°N 6.984759°W

Playing kits
Standard colours

Senior Club Championships
	All Ireland	Leinster champions	Kildare champions
Football:	-	-	4

Ellistown is a Gaelic Athletic Association (GAA) club in County Kildare, Ireland, winner of four county senior football championships, including two under their former name of "Mountrice Blunts". They also played as Knavinstown for a period and combined with Ballykelly to form an area team, St Brigid's. Jack Donnelly was a member of the Kildare football team of the millennium.

== History ==
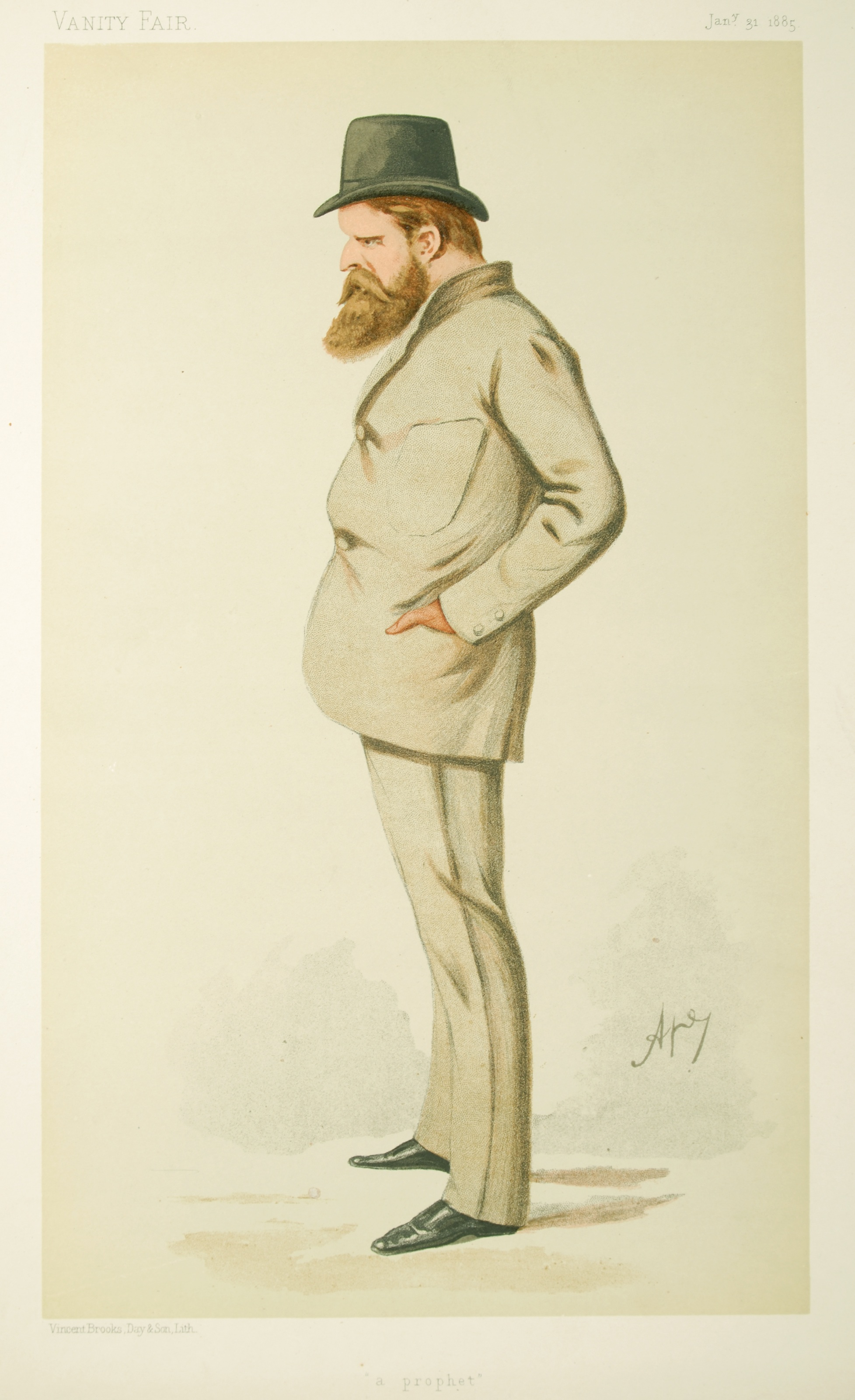
The Ellistown GAA club was formerly named for Wilfred Scawen Blunt (1840–1922), an English anti-imperialist writer who supported Irish independence.

Founded on 29 January 1888, by the time they were four years in existence, Wilfred Scawen Blunts of Mountrice had won two fierce local derby county finals with Kildare reached the Leinster final, and started a football tradition in the area that continues. RIC records from 1890 show that the club named after English liberal supporter of Home Rule, Wilfrid Scawen Blunt, had 50 members with officers listed as Terence Byrne, JJ Malone, William Curry and John Corry. Patrick Kelly and James Cooney attended the 1889 convention. They gave a walkover to Dublin Young Irelands in the 1891 Leinster final and just four months after the Blunts had qualified for the Leinster final, club secretary Terence Byrne wrote to the 1892 county convention to say the club had broken up. Their successors Knavinstown were involved in the reconstitution of Kildare GAA in 1901. They were succeeded by Umerus, a second Mountrice club, Springfield (a 1927 amalgamation between Rathangan and Ellistown), and finally Ellistown.

== Gaelic football ==
Of the 1891 Mountrice team, Pat Martin was grandfather of 1960s ace scorer Jack Donnelly, while Jim was father of Bob and Paddy - All Ireland medallist, inter-provincial, and Tailteann Games international in the 1920s. Ellistown were promoted in 1935, went to the semi-final in 1936, losing to Curragh having beaten Sarsfields on the way, lost the 1937 first round to Sarsfields, and eventually reached the 1938 county final. The first of two successive Ellistown v Kildare St. Patrick's finals never took place because six Ellistown players were ill, and they were surprised when a walkover rather than a refixture was given. They won the title the following year, Ellistown won revenge, 3-2 to 1-3. Ned Cullen put a shot through the net, while Michael "Butt" Donnelly got a goal for Ellistown. Ellistown won their second and last title in 1944, when opponents Carbury had a player sent off and struck the posts. Four Ellistown players were almost left behind when the bus on which they were travelling broke down. Davey Graham arrived just as the teams were lining up behind the band. Ellistown won 1-4 to 0-4. Ellistown, now with many of the sons of former stars on the side, returned to senior ranks in 1964 having come straight from junior B in two years. It was 1968 before Ellistown, now with Jack Donnelly breaking scoring records, made a real impact on the senior championship, when they beat Maynooth and Sarsfields and qualified for a semi-final against Carbury that went to two matches and saw punches thrown freely before Carbury qualified by five points. In 1972 eight points from Jack Donnelly helped Ellistown to a 2-12 to 1-11 victory over Sarsfields and a place in the county final. Tom Moore got two Carbury goals within ten minutes of the restart, and Carbury cantered home 3-14 to 1-7. Six Ellistown players survived for their junior championship win nine years earlier.

== Honours ==
- Kildare Senior Football Championship: (2) 1939, 1944
- Kildare Intermediate Football Championship: (4) 1935, 1951, 1964, 2000
- Kildare Junior Football Championship (3) 1922, 1999, 2024
- Kildare Junior B Football Championship: (1) 1963
- Under 14 All Ireland feile Champions (August) 2008
- 2018 Senior football league division 4 champions

=== Mountrice Blunts Honours ===
- Kildare Senior Football Championship: (2) 1889, 1891.
- Kildare Team Of the Millennium Jack Donnelly

== Bibliography ==
- Kildare GAA: A Centenary History, by Eoghan Corry, CLG Chill Dara, 1984, ISBN 0-9509370-0-2 hb ISBN 0-9509370-1-0 pb
- Kildare GAA yearbook, 1972, 1974, 1978, 1979, 1980 and 2000- in sequence especially the Millennium yearbook of 2000
- Soaring Sliothars: Centenary of Kildare Camogie 1904-2004 by Joan O'Flynn Kildare County Camogie Board.
