= Castlemitchell GAA =

Irish Gaelic Athletic Association club

Castlemitchell GFC
- Caisleán an Mhistéalaigh
- Founded: 1939
- County: Kildare
- Nickname: The Mitchells
- Colours: Green and White
- Grounds: Castlemitchell GAA Field, Castlereban South, Churchtown, County Kildare
- Coordinates: 53.016694°N 7.040993°W

Playing kits
Standard colours

Castlemitchell GFC is a Gaelic Athletic Association (GAA) club in County Kildare, Ireland, who reached senior status in the 1950s and again in the 1990s from a small catchment area, and is home club of 1998 All Ireland finalist Christy Byrne. It is also the home club Tadhg Fennin who still plays for the men's senior team, a 2000 Leinster Championship winner with Kildare also scoring a goal in the final that day against Dublin.

== History ==
The area west of Athy has had organized football since the foundation of the GAA. RIC records from 1890 show that Foxhill club had 50 members with officers listed as Lewis Higgins, Laurence Cullen and Thomas Malone. Joe Bermingham and Jim Connor founded Castlemitchell club in 1939 and were nicknamed the "sanpits". They purchased their own field in 1999, located about 2.5 km (1.5 mi) northeast of Castlemitchell village.

== Gaelic football ==
Castlemitchell played in a replayed Junior final in 1943. They were promoted in 1945, contested the intermediate final of 1952 and won the championship in 1953. They won a junior championship in 1983 and an intermediate championship in 1992. Christy Byrne featured on the 1998 Kildare All Ireland team.

== Honours ==
- Kildare Junior Football Championship Winners: (2) 1983, 2015. Finalist: (1) 2014
- Kildare Dowling Cup (2) 2011, 2012
- Kildare Senior Football Reserve D Championship (1) 2010
- Kildare Intermediate Football Championship (2) 1953, 1992
- Kildare Senior Football League Division 2: (1) 1975
- Kildare Senior Football Championship Semi-finalists 1959.

== Bibliography ==
- Kildare GAA: A Centenary History, by Eoghan Corry, CLG Chill Dara, 1984, ISBN 0-9509370-0-2 hb ISBN 0-9509370-1-0 pb
- Kildare GAA yearbook, 1972, 1974, 1978, 1979, 1980 and 2000- in sequence especially the Millennium yearbook of 2000
- Soaring Sliothars: Centenary of Kildare Camogie 1904-2004 by Joan O'Flynn Kildare County Camogie Board.
