= Kilcock GAA =

Gaelic sports club in County Kildare, Ireland

Kilcock
- Cill Chóca
- Founded: 1887
- County: Kildare
- Nickname: "The green and gold"
- Colours: Green and Gold
- Grounds: Branganstown, Kilcock
- Coordinates: 53.3945°N 6.6680°W

Playing kits
Standard colours

Senior Club Championships
	All Ireland	Leinster champions	Kildare champions
Football:	-	-	5

Kilcock is a Gaelic Athletic Association (GAA) club in Kilcock, County Kildare, Ireland. Located on the border with County Meath, Kilcock traditionally draws it players from the village itself as well as the surrounding rural areas of Laragh, Ballycaghan, Clonfert and Belgard. The club has won five Kildare Senior Football Championships, the last such win being in 1958. Kilcock was "Kildare club of the year" in 1982. It is the home club of Davy Dalton Jr., winner of the 1997 All Stars Award.

== History ==
Kilcock GAA was founded in 1887 and originally known as Kilcock O'Connell's. Six Kilcock men won All Ireland Senior Football Championships with Kildare - including in 1905 and 1919. Kilcock won their first Senior Football Championship in 1914 beating Clane GAA 1–4 to 0–4. Kilcock repeated this success in 1917 beating Kilcullen GAA by 5–0 to 2–1.

In 1950, Kilcock won the Junior A and overall Junior championship. The club later secured promotion to the senior ranks in 1953 and won the Leader Cup (Division One League) the same year. This was followed by Senior Football Championship titles in 1955, 1957 and 1958. Kilcock last won the Kildare Senior Football Championship in 1958 when they defeated Round Towers GAA (Kildare) on a scoreline of 3–12 to 3–8.

The 1960s saw some decline, and in 1968, the club was relegated to intermediate level. However, the spell at intermediate level was short-lived as the club went on to win the Intermediate Championship in 1969.

1970 saw the formal unification of Kilcock and Cappagh GAA as a senior team. However this amalgamation did not last long and when Cappagh acquired their own field in Ballyvoneen in May 1971, both clubs went their separate ways. After the break-up, Kilcock was re-graded to Junior A was to play football at this level for the rest of the decade.

The highlight of the 1970s was a Junior B championship final appearance in 1979. Also in 1979, the club moved from the Bawnog to Branganstown. After nearly 90 years playing at the Bawnog, the club played its final game there and later moved to grounds in Branganstown.

In 1981, the club won both Junior B and Junior C and defeated Naas to claim the Jack Higgins cup. In 1982, Kilcock won the Intermediate championship. Kilcock competed at the senior level for 18 years before finally, in 2000, making it to the SFC final. However, the team came second to a Moorefield GAA team. In 2003, the senior footballers captured the SFL Division 1 title, while also reaching the SFC final again, losing to Round Towers GAA (Kildare). By 2011, Kilcock had been relegated back to the Intermediate level.

Kilcock also fields hurling and camogie teams and, in 2018, Kilcock won the Kildare Junior Hurling Championship. A week later, the club won the promotion/relegation playoff against Celbridge to seal Intermediate status for 2019. Kilcock's camogie team won back-to-back Kildare Junior Camogie titles is 2017 and 2018, and reached the Kildare Intermediate final in their first year playing at the level in 2019, where they were defeated by neighbours Cappagh GAA by a single point.

Kilcock returned to the Senior Ranks of Kildare Club football in 2022 after a replay win over Ballymore Eustace the full time score ending Kilcock 1-16 to 0-7 for Ballymore Eustace in the 2021 IFC Final. In the same year, both the Kilcock Ladies Football and camogie teams won their respective Kildare Intermediate Championships, with the footballers beating Kilcullen by 4-06 to 1-13 and the camogie team defeating St. Laurences by a scoreline of 0-06 to 0-05.

== Honors ==
- Kildare Senior Football Championship (5): 1914, 1917, 1955, 1957, 1958
- Kildare Senior Football League Division 1 (2): 1953, 2003
- Kildare Intermediate Football Championship (4): 1938, 1969, 1982, 2021
- Kildare Junior Football Championship (2): 1937, 1950
- Kildare Under 21 Football Championship (1): 1999
- Kildare Intermediate Football League (1): 1950
- Kildare Junior B Football Championship (1): 1981
- Kildare Junior C Football Championship (1): 1981
- Aldridge Cup (1): 2009
- Jack Higgins Cup (1): 1981
