= Rathcoffey GAA =

Gaelic games club in County Kildare, Ireland

Rathcoffey
- Ráth Cobhthaigh
- Founded: 1888
- County: Kildare
- Colours: Blue and white
- Grounds: Mooretown Drive, Rathcoffey
- Coordinates: 53.33318°N 6.690545°W

Playing kits
Standard colours

Rathcoffey is a Gaelic Athletic Association (GAA) club in County Kildare, Ireland. Teresa Lynch, Nuala Malone and Eileen Reilly were selected on the Kildare camogie team of the century. Rathcoffey are currently a junior team in Kildare and are competing in the third league division of Kildare.

Rathcoffey forms St Edward's along with Straffan for underage purposes and St Edward's fields teams at all levels from Under 9 to Under 21.

== Honours ==
- Kildare Junior Hurling Championship 1935
- Kildare Junior Football Championship: 1945, 1955, 1990

== Bibliography ==
- Kildare GAA: A Centenary History, by Eoghan Corry, CLG Chill Dara, 1984, ISBN 0-9509370-0-2 hb ISBN 0-9509370-1-0 pb
- Kildare GAA yearbook, 1972, 1974, 1978, 1979, 1980 and 2000- in sequence especially the Millennium yearbook of 2000
- Soaring Sliothars: Centenary of Kildare Camogie 1904–2004 by Joan O'Flynn Kildare County Camogie Board.
