= Rheban GAA =

Gaelic games club in County Kildare, Ireland

Rheban
- Riobáin
- Founded: 1929
- County: Kildare
- Colours: Blue and white
- Grounds: Tom Moore Memorial Park, Newtownbert, Kilberry
- Coordinates: 53.023309°N 7.004353°W

Playing kits
Standard colours

Rheban /ˈrɛbən/ is a Gaelic Athletic Association (GAA) club based in southwest County Kildare, Ireland, near Kilberry. The club has won the Kildare GAA "club of the year" award on several occasions, including in 1996 and 1997. They competed in the senior championship in the 1940s, reaching the semi-final in 1945, and after winning the Junior and Intermediate championships in successive years in 1996-7. The club takes its name from nearby Rheban Castle.

== Honours ==
- Kildare Intermediate Football Championship: (3) 1942, 1970, 1997
- Kildare Junior Football Championship: (3) 1940, 1969, 1996
- Jack Higgins Cup (2) 1969, 1996
- Kildare Senior Football League Division 3: (1) 1996
- Kildare Senior Football League Division 4: (1) 1984
- Dowling Cup (1) 2008
- The Leinster Leader Junior Club Cup (4) 1995, 1998, 2002, 2007
- Kildare Junior D Football League (1) 1996
- Kildare Under-21 C Football Championship (1) 2014
- Kildare Under-21 B Football Championship (1) 1999
- Kildare Minor B Football Championship (1) 1996
- Kildare Minor Football League Div. 4 (1) 2013
- Kildare Ladies Football Junior C Championship (1) 2013
- Kildare Club of the Year (3) 1969, 1996, 1997

== Bibliography ==
- Kildare GAA: A Centenary History, by Eoghan Corry, CLG Chill Dara, 1984, ISBN 0-9509370-0-2 hb ISBN 0-9509370-1-0 pb
- Kildare GAA yearbook, 1972, 1974, 1978, 1979, 1980 and 2000- in sequence especially the Millennium yearbook of 2000
- Soaring Sliothars: Centenary of Kildare Camogie 1904-2004 by Joan O'Flynn Kildare County Camogie Board.
