= Sallins GAA =

Gaelic games club in County Kildare, Ireland

Sallins
- Na Solláin
- Founded: 1885
- County: Kildare
- Colours: White and Green
- Grounds: Sallins GAA Field, Sallins Wood, Sallins
- Coordinates: 53.250528°N 6.662006°W

Playing kits
Standard colours

Sallins is a Gaelic Athletic Association (GAA) club in Sallins, County Kildare, Ireland, winner of Kildare club of the year in 2001.

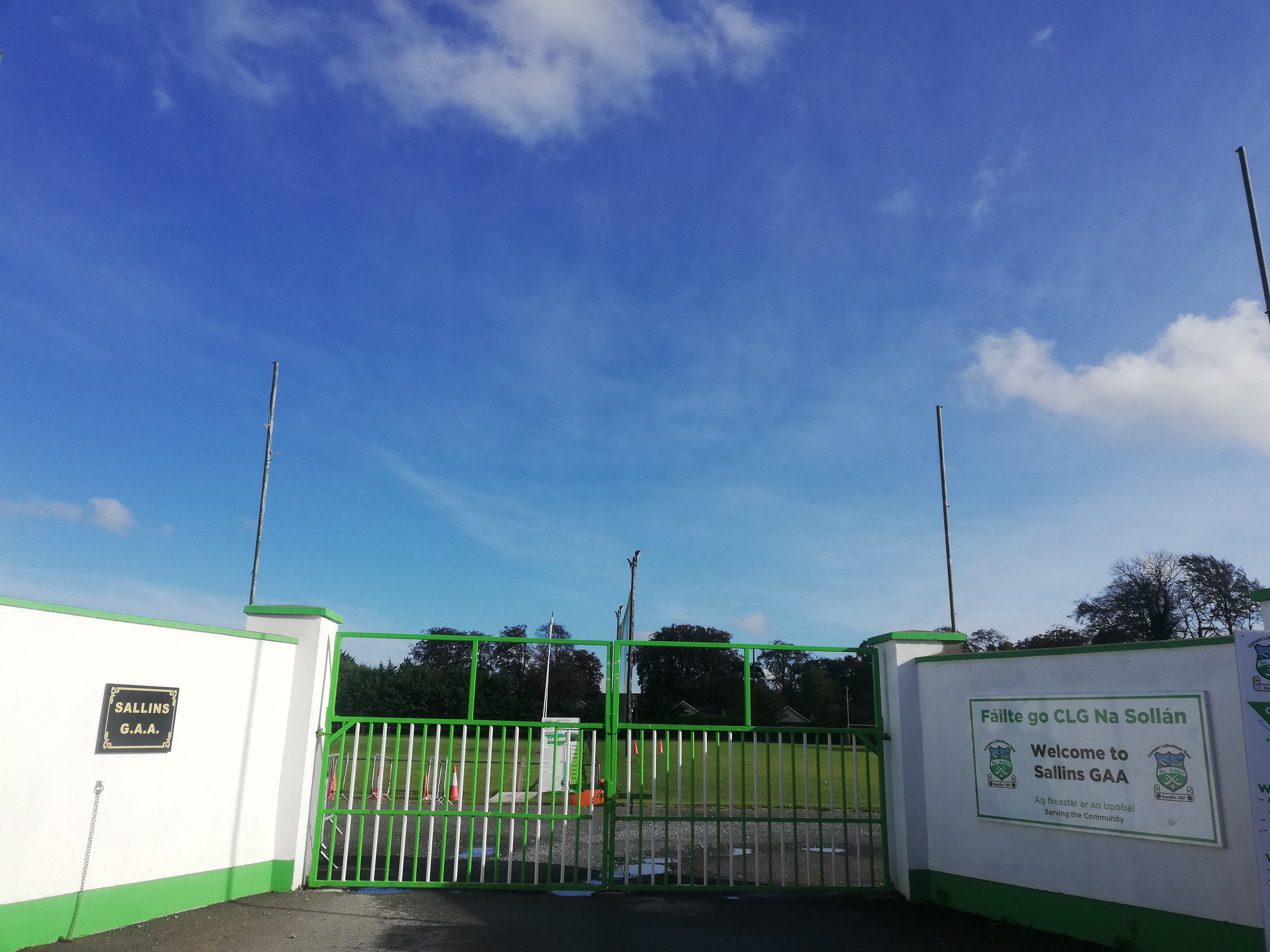
Entrance gates at Sallins GAA grounds.

== Hurling ==
Sallins also has a separate hurling club. While juvenile hurling is part of the main Sallins GAA club, their men’s team has been set up as a separate club due to a conflict of interest for some footballers.

After a break of over 30 years, Sallins started juvenile hurling in 2002 and fielded an adult team in 2003 and has been competing ever since.

The current hurling side play in the Junior League and Championship. In 2009, the hurlers made both league and championship semi finals.

== Ladies football ==
After many years playing as an amalgamated team with players from the nearby village of Carragh, Sallins had their first adult ladies football team in 2018. They have had several successes since then, winning a division 7 league title in 2018, and a junior c championship cup in 2021. In 2021 the ladies footballers fielded two minor teams.

== Camogie ==
As of 2021, the club fields camogie teams up to U17 level.

== Honours ==
- Kildare Intermediate Football Championship: (4) 1967, 1977, 2003, 2025
- Leinster Intermediate Club Football Championship (1): 2025
- Kildare Junior Football Championship: (3) 1966, 1973, 2001
- Leinster Junior Club Football Championship: (1) 2000
- Jack Higgins Cup Winners (3) 1966, 1973, 2001
- The Niall Smullen Cup (5) 1925, 1946, 1954, 1971, 1985
- Conneff Cup winners 2002
- LGFA Junior C Championship winners 2021

== Bibliography ==
- Kildare GAA: A Centenary History, by Eoghan Corry, CLG Chill Dara, 1984, ISBN 978-0-9509370-0-7 hb ISBN 978-0-9509370-1-4 pb
- Kildare GAA yearbook, 1972, 1974, 1978, 1979, 1980 and 2000- in sequence especially the Millennium yearbook of 2000
- Soaring Sliothars: Centenary of Kildare Camogie 1904–2004 by Joan O'Flynn Kildare County Camogie Board.
