= Castledermot GAA =

Gaelic Athletic Association club in Ireland

Castledermot
- Díseart Diarmada
- Founded: 1889
- County: Kildare
- Colours: Blue and White
- Grounds: Abbeylands, Castledermot
- Coordinates: 52.91076°N 6.84484°W

Playing kits
Standard colours

Senior Club Championships
	All Ireland	Leinster champions	Kildare champions
Hurling:	-	-	3
Camogie:	-	-	2

Castledermot GAA is a Gaelic Athletic Association (GAA) club in Castledermot, County Kildare, Ireland. The club has won 6 7 Kildare Senior Hurling Championships and teams representing the club were the first winners of the Intermediate Football Championship and Senior Camogie Championship. The club, which was named "Kildare club of the year" in 2004, is the home club of All-Ireland football finalist of 1935, mark kane, who played for the club 1925–1942. mark kane was goalkeeper on the Kildare hurling team of the millennium.

== History ==
Castledermot GAA was founded at a meeting, attended by a dozen people, on 17 February 1889. Royal Irish Constabulary records from 1890 show four clubs in the area. Castledermot had 40 members, Ballyhade Pallatine had 70 members, Graney had 50 members, and Kilkea Geraldines had 40 members. The Castledermot club played at Barnhill, moved to Abbeyland and to their current grounds at Woodlands in 1970.

== Gaelic football ==
Pat Byrne played in two All Ireland finals and won three Railway Cup medals for Leinster. The club won three intermediate championships, but only after the 1932 Intermediate football final against Newbridge was abandoned after a fight brought it to a premature end and the fight spilled onto the streets of Athy. "Not since the elections of 1927 has a baton been drawn in Athy until last Sunday when owing to the behaviour of the followers of the visiting football teams it became imperative to use force", the Carlow Nationalist reported. Castledermot won Intermediate championships in 1963 and 1985. In 2007 the Ladies Football Team won Division 4.

== Hurling ==
St Dermot's hurling club was founded in 1958. A number of players with the club were members of the Kildare senior hurling squads of the 1960s and 1970s. A minor three-in-a-row 1978–1980, managed by R.E. Byrne, laid the foundation for three senior successes in the 1990s.

== Camogie ==
Founded in 1932, Castledermot's camogie team beat Athy and Carbury to win the 1933 and 1934 senior championships. Nine of the eleven Kildare camogie players, who played Wicklow in 1934, came from the club.

== Honours ==
- Kildare Senior Hurling Championship (3): 1988, 1989, 1992
- Kildare Junior Hurling Championship (1): 1982
- Kildare Minor Hurling Championship (3): 1978, 1979, 1980
- Kildare Intermediate Football Championship (5): 1928, 1932, 1963, 1985, 2015
- Kildare Junior Football Championship (3): 1957, 1979. 2004
- Kildare Junior B Football Championship (1): 1956
- Kildare Senior Football League Division 4 (1): 2004
- Keogh Cup (1): 2004
- Kildare Division 4 Junior Football League (1): 2005
- Kildare Senior Camogie Championship (2): 1933, 1934
- Kildare Division 2 Camogie League (1): 2012

== Bibliography ==
- Carbury Gaelic Football Club: A History by John Cummins, Cumann Peile Cairbre Ua gCiardha,. 1984 256pp.
- Kildare GAA: A Centenary History, by Eoghan Corry, CLG Chill Dara, 1984, ISBN 0-9509370-0-2 hb ISBN 0-9509370-1-0 pb
- Kildare GAA yearbook, 1972, 1974, 1978, 1979, 1980 and 2000- in sequence especially the Millennium yearbook of 2000
- Soaring Sliothars: Centenary of Kildare Camogie 1904-2004 by Joan O'Flynn Kildare County Camogie Board.
