= Ballykelly GFC =

Gaelic games club in County Kildare, Ireland

Ballykelly
- Bealach Eile
- Founded: 1953
- County: Kildare
- Colours: Maroon and White
- Grounds: Highbridge, Ballykelly, Lackagh, County Kildare
- Coordinates: 53.157°N 7.053°W

Playing kits
Standard colours

Ballykelly Gaelic Football Club is a Gaelic football based Gaelic Athletic Association (GAA) club in County Kildare, Ireland, north of Monasterevin. They field teams from U6 to senior in both ladies' and men's football.

== History ==
=== Football Club ===
The present-day club was founded in 1953, and immediately began fundraising and training in Banderra.

=== Ladies' Football ===
The Ballykelly girls' Under 14 team was registered in the spring of 1994 and contained 21 players. In 1997, after a few years of success, Ballykelly and Athgarvan GAA arranged to have players represent both teams.

In 1999 saw the formation of an Under 12 team and the reformation of the Under 14 team; in 2001 a Senior Ladies' team was formed.

== Grounds ==
The club purchased its first pitch in 1982 next to the Highbridge. The pitch and club rooms were opened on 16 October 1983 by Hugh Campion, former chairman of Kildare County Board. The facilities were updated after that with the addition of new dressing rooms and showers.

In 2005 the club purchased 17-acre (6.9 ha) in the townland of Ballykelly. This new development was completed and officially opened on 16 May 2010. The facility was named as Kildare "Grounds of the Year" for 2010.

== Honours ==
- Kildare Intermediate Football Championship Winners (3) 1955, 1960, 1975
- Kildare Junior Football Championship: Winners (2) 1974, 2007

== Bibliography ==
- Kildare GAA: A Centenary History, by Eoghan Corry, CLG Chill Dara, 1984, ISBN 0-9509370-0-2 hb ISBN 0-9509370-1-0 pb
- Kildare GAA yearbook, 1972, 1974, 1978, 1979, 1980 and 2000- in sequence especially the Millennium yearbook of 2000
- Soaring Sliothars: Centenary of Kildare Camogie 1904–2004 by Joan O'Flynn Kildare County Camogie Board.
