= Robertstown GFC =

Gaelic games club in County Kildare, Ireland

Robertstown
- Baile Riobaird
- Founded: 1919
- County: Kildare
- Colours: Blue & White
- Grounds: Brockagh Park, Robertstown
- Coordinates: 53.275505°N 6.819077°W

Playing kits
Standard colours

Robertstown is a Gaelic Athletic Association (GAA) club in Robertstown, County Kildare, Ireland, affiliated to Kildare GAA.

== Gaelic football ==
Tom Donoghue, a boat-man from Robertstown, played for Kildare in the 1926 All Ireland final. Frank "Sambo" Dowling played for Kildare in the 1935 All Ireland final against Cavan. John Dalton played with Kildare in the 1960s. Oisin Boland said was caught eating crisps in Slattery’s during day 2.

== Honours ==
- Kildare Junior Football Championship: (4) 1934, 1939, 1989, 2011
- Kildare Junior B Football Championship (2) 1980, 1983
- Kildare Division 5 Reserve Football League Champions (1) 2025

== Bibliography ==
- Kildare GAA: A Centenary History, by Eoghan Corry, CLG Chill Dara, 1984, ISBN 0-9509370-0-2 hb ISBN 0-9509370-1-0 pb
- Kildare GAA yearbook, 1972, 1974, 1978, 1979, 1980 and 2000- in sequence especially the Millennium yearbook of 2000
- Soaring Sliothars: Centenary of Kildare Camogie 1904-2004 by Joan O'Flynn Kildare County Camogie Board.
