= Kilcullen GAA =

Gaelic games club in County Kildare, Ireland

Kilcullen
- Cill Chuillinn
- Founded: 1889
- County: Kildare
- Nickname: The Rags
- Colours: Black and white
- Grounds: Kilcullen GAA Club, Kilcullen
- Coordinates: 53.129419°N 6.75127°W

Playing kits
Standard colours

Kilcullen is an Intermediate Gaelic Athletic Association (GAA) club in Kilcullen, County Kildare, Ireland, which played a leading role in developing the games in the county.

== History ==
Kilcullen town sports predate the GAA. The club was founded in 1889, and at first wore green and gold. They changed to black and white to honour the New Zealand national rugby union team ("All Blacks"), who played in Dublin in 1905. Their nickname, "The Rags", comes from a friendly game against Isles of the Sea where the Dubliners insulted the Kilcullen team's shabby kit.

The club crest depicts the round tower of Old Kilcullen, with its distinctive uneven top.

== Gaelic football ==
Kilcullen were beaten by Clane in the 1892 county final. They lost to Moorefield 0-2 to 2-11 in the 1962 final.

== Ladies Gaelic football ==
Kilcullen Ladies won their first ever Championship at senior level on 3 September 2016. They defeated Celbridge in the final of the Junior B Championship with a final scoreline of 5-17 to 2-05.

The Ladies section of the club had a successful 2018 season, winning at Division 1 level in all age groups from U13, U14, U15, U16 and Minor. The U14s won the All Ireland B Feile. The Senior side also added to the club's second ever Ladies Senior championship by defeating Na Fianna in the Ladies Junior A final.

The Ladies now compete at Senior level, with several players lining out for Kildare at various levels. In 2023, two club players were part of the Kildare panel which won the All Ireland Intermediate Championship.

== Camogie ==
Michelle Aspell was selected on the Kildare camogie team of the century.

== Honours ==
- Kildare Senior Football Championship: Finalists 1892. 1917. 1962.
- Kildare Intermediate Football Championship: (5) 1945, 1956, 1961, 1976, 1998
- Kildare Junior Football Championship: (7) 1914, 1943, 1953, 1971, 1997, 2016, 2021
- Leinster Junior Club Football Championship: (1) 1997 (Runner-Up 2021)
- Kildare Ladies Junior A Championship (1) 2018
- Kildare Ladies Junior B Championship (1) 2016
- Kildare Minor Ladies Division 1 (1) 2018
- Jack Higgins Cup (3) 1953, 1971, 1997
- Kildare Under-21 B Football Championship (1) 2003
- Kildare Under-21 D Football Championship (1) 2015
- Keogh Cup Champions (1) 2010
- Kildare Intermediate 'B' Football Championship (1) 2010
- Kildare Junior 'B' Football Championship (1) 1970

== Bibliography ==
- Kilcullen Gaelic Athletic Association 1889 1984 by Arty Aspell. Kilcullen GAA Nd, 75pp.
- Kildare GAA: A Centenary History, by Eoghan Corry, CLG Chill Dara, 1984, ISBN 0-9509370-0-2 hb ISBN 0-9509370-1-0 pb
- Kildare GAA yearbook, 1972, 1974, 1978, 1979, 1980 and 2000- in sequence especially the Millennium yearbook of 2000
- Soaring Sliothars: Centenary of Kildare Camogie 1904-2004 by Joan O'Flynn Kildare County Camogie Board.
