= Milltown GAA (County Kildare) =

Gaelic games club in County Kildare, Ireland

Milltown
- Baile an Mhuilinn
- Founded: 1888
- County: Kildare
- Colours: Green and red
- Grounds: Christy Dowling Park, Milltown
- Coordinates: 53.2042°N 6.8552°W

Playing kits
Standard colours

Milltown is a Gaelic Athletic Association club in Milltown, County Kildare, Ireland.

== History ==
Milltown have been affiliated to the GAA since 1888.

Milltown won the Junior Championship in 2008 defeating Robertstown by a single point.

In 2017, the club's U21 team were the first U21 team from Milltown to win a championship title.

At some underage grades Milltown, along with Allenwood, Ballyteague & Robertstown, form part of the combined club which represents the parish of Allen, Na Fianna.

== Achievements ==
- Leinster Junior Club Football Championship: (1) 2023
- Jack Higgins Cup: (1) 1967
- Kildare Intermediate Football Championship: (1) 1972
- Kildare Junior Football Championship: (4) 1944, 2008, 2018, 2023

== Bibliography ==
- Red Sashes and Proud Hearts: 125 Years of Milltown GAA, by Ronan Byrne (2013)
- Kildare GAA: A Centenary History, by Eoghan Corry, CLG Chill Dara, 1984, ISBN 0-9509370-0-2 hb ISBN 0-9509370-1-0 pb
- Kildare GAA yearbook, 1972, 1974, 1978, 1979, 1980 and 2000- in sequence especially the Millennium yearbook of 2000
