= Ballymore Eustace GAA =

Gaelic games club in County Kildare, Ireland

Ballymore Eustace
- An Baile Mór
- Founded: 1928
- County: Kildare
- Nickname: The Battlers
- Colours: Green and Gold
- Grounds: Bishopslane, Ballymore Eustace
- Coordinates: 53.130603°N 6.589222°W

Playing kits
Standard colours

Senior Club Championships
	All Ireland	Leinster champions	Kildare champions
Football:	-	-	1

Ballymore Eustace GAA is a Gaelic Athletic Association (GAA) club in Ballymore Eustace, County Kildare, Ireland, winner of the county senior football championships in 1953, completing the remarkable achievement of winning junior, intermediate and senior titles in successive years.

== History ==
RIC records from 1890 show that Ballymore Irish Brigade had 34 members with officers listed as Revd J McCarthy, John Byrne, Laurence Morrissey and Pat Keenan. The club affiliated 1887–1926. James Doyle and Anthony Corrigan attended the 1889 convention. Kilmoney near Baltinglass was also recorded as affiliated to Kildare GAA in a Leinster Leader of 1890. Ballymore participated in the first Kildare junior championship in 1906. In 1916 it left the GAA altogether over a dispute with the County Board over the right to appeal a decision, resulting from a dispute over the Junior Football final with Kilcullen. After that, Ballymore was a soccer town. One of its most famous sons was Jack Byrne of Bohemians and Shamrock Rovers.

== Gaelic Football ==
Ballymore reformed in 1928 and won the county minor championship in 1943. That team came from Junior B in 1949 to win the Junior Championship in 1951, Intermediate Championship in 1952 and the Senior Championship in 1953. Larry Stanley trained the team that won the senior championship in 1953, his nephew Jim Clarke scored the winning goal. Clarke, Kevin Burke and Myles Doyle went on to star on Kildare football teams. Ten of the team had been on the side that won the Junior B championship five years earlier. No other club has won the junior, intermediate and senior championships in successive seasons in Kildare. They reached the 1956 county final and lost 1–6 to 0–4 against a Military College team that did not have a single Kildareman, and suffered the abuse of the press and the County Board after a rough match in which one Ballymore player was sent off, two players were expelled from the Association, and another was suspended for two months. Other achievements include a spectacular 6–3 to 0–3 victory over Kilcock in the Intermediate League final of 1951 which place in February 1953, when both were senior teams. There was an echo of the past when Ballymore won junior and intermediate championships in successive years 1985–1986. In 1985 Ballymore overcame the challenge of a strong Ballyteague side, while in 1986 they defeated hot favourites Suncroft in the final. They also defeated Castledermot in 1994 to regain the Intermediate Championship crown and Senior status. Ballymore have since been regraded and contest the Intermediate Championship. On 16 October 2010 Ballymore once more won the Intermediate Championship defeating Confey in a closely contested final. On 16 January 2011 Ballymore won the 2010 Leinster Intermediate Football Championship defeating Nobber (Meath) by 0–12 to 0–10 in the delayed final played on their home pitch

== Handball ==
Ballymore Eustace court was constructed during the First World War. A roof and gallery was added in the 1920s, in 1953 the walls were raised and lighting was installed in 1962. The club was affiliated to the Irish Amateur Handball Union until it ceased in 1935. Tommy Leahy was the leading IAHU player of the 1920s while Jack Byrne, Jack Byrne, Mick Dowling and Jim Dolan also won titles. When Ballymore affiliated to the GAA handball body in 1940, Mick Dowling came out of retirement to win junior and senior hardball titles within three years. Although softballs had been introduced in 1915 the leather hardball game was the prestige event of handball until the 1950s, winning five hardball titles. In 1979 Tom O'Rourke brought the first softball title to Ballymore when he beat Packie Ryan of Dublin. All of Kildare's top handballers of that era, Tom O'Rourke, Cecil and Pius Winders, Matt Purcell, Greg Lawlor and Michael Dowling (son of the old IAHU and IAHA champions) came from Ballymore.

== Camogie ==
A Ballymore team applied to the Kildare GAA board for recognition in 1921. Camogie was revived in the 1950s when the registered colours were maroon and again in 1980, when the registered colours were green and white.

== Honours ==
- Kildare Senior Football Championship Winners 1953
- Leinster Intermediate Club Football Championship Winners 2010
- Kildare Intermediate Football Championship Winners (4) 1952, 1986, 1994, 2010
- Kildare Junior A Championship: (4) 1951, 1985, 2017, 2019
- Kildare Junior B Football Championship 1949, 1968
- Kildare Intermediate Football League 1951
- Kildare Div 3 Football League 1999
- Kildare Division 2 Football League 2003
- Kildare Junior Football League 1913
- Kildare Minor Football Championship 1943
- Kildare Ladies Division 4 League Runners-up 2007 Ballymore-Eustace Ladies
- Kildare Ladies Junior D County Championship 2008 Ballymore-Eustace Ladies
- Kildare Ladies Division 5 Winners 2018 Ballymore Eustace Ladies

== Bibliography ==
- Ballymore: Official Opening Of Ballymore GAA Grounds (September 1994)
- Kildare GAA: A Centenary History, by Eoghan Corry, CLG Chill Dara, 1984, ISBN 0-9509370-0-2 hb ISBN 0-9509370-1-0 pb
- Kildare GAA yearbook, 1972, 1974, 1978, 1979, 1980 and 2000– in sequence especially the Millennium yearbook of 2000
- Soaring Sliothars: Centenary of Kildare Camogie 1904–2004 by Joan O'Flynn Kildare County Camogie Board.
- Handball, The Game The Players, The History by Tom McElligott, Wolfhound, 1984 ISBN 0-86327-018-2.
- From Leahy’s Field to Bishoplane, A History of Ballymore Eustace GAA (1887-2016] by Henry Murphy.
