= Straffan GFC =

Gaelic games club in County Kildare, Ireland

Straffan
- Teach Srafáin
- Founded: 1885
- County: Kildare
- Colours: White with Blue sash
- Grounds: Straffan GAA Grounds
- Coordinates: 53.311213°N 6.606538°W

Playing kits
Standard colours

Straffan Gaelic Football Club is a Gaelic football club in Straffan, County Kildare, Ireland.

== History ==
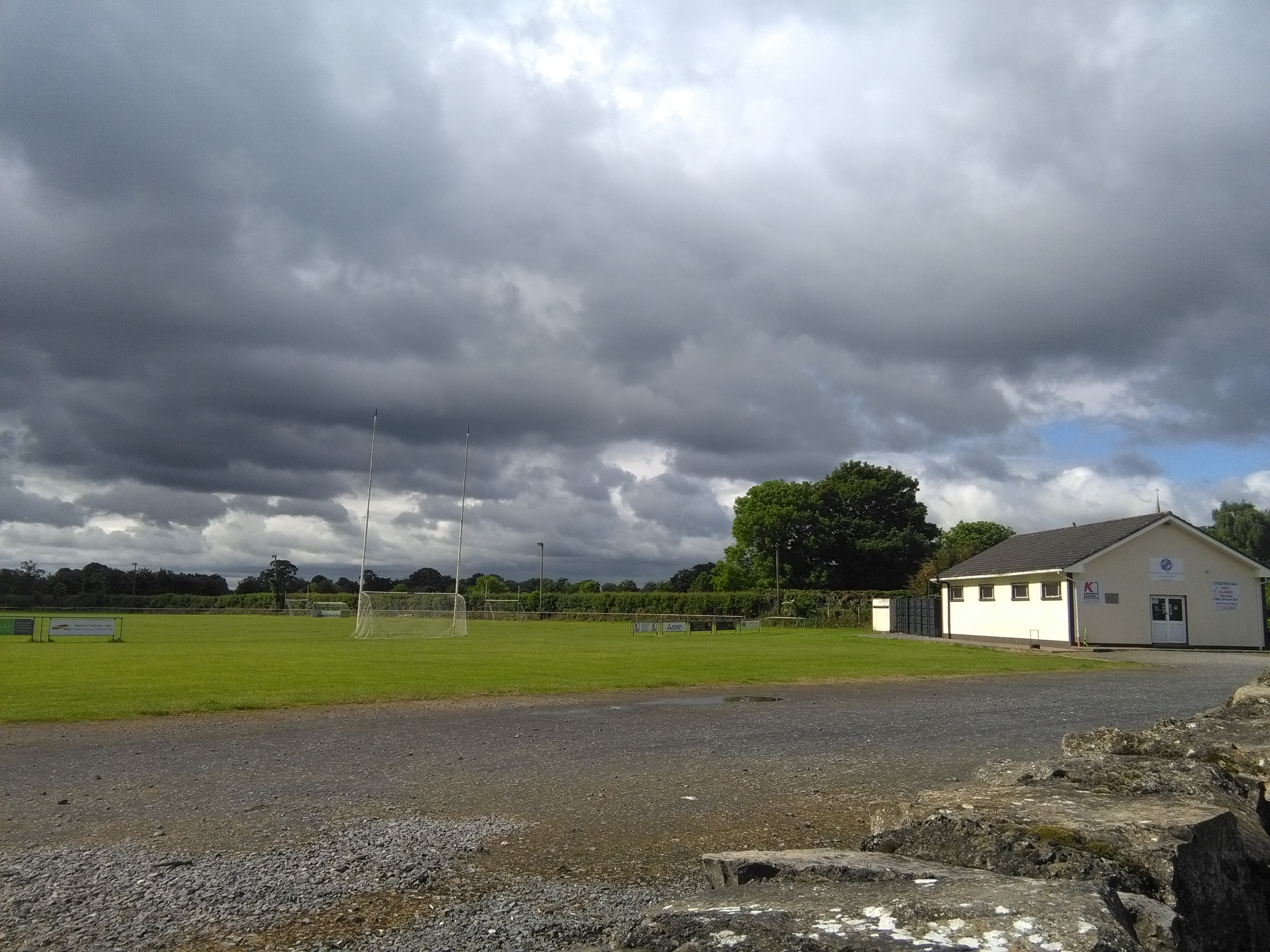
Straffan GAA grounds (2017)

A revival occurred with the appointment of Billy Farrell as first team manager in 1999, and the team won the Junior B championship in 2001. In 2005 the first team won promotion to division 2 of the Kildare Senior Football League, while the second team also won promotion to division 2 of the Junior Football League. Straffan began to gather momentum ever since promotion to division 2. priority for the club was to win the Junior football championship which had been a scorn for the club over the years. A junior final appearance was made in 2006 but Straffan were narrowly beaten by Nurney GFC. Numerous semi final appearances were made after that but with little success. However, in 2009 under the management of Liam McLoughlin Straffan finally broke the hoodoo and won the Junior football championship with a last minute goal by Andy O'Neill. Straffan fields 2 adult teams at the moment and forms St Edward’s along with Ardclough and Rathcoffey for underage purposes and St Edwards fields teams at all levels from Under 9 to Under 21.

== Honours ==
- Kildare Intermediate Football Championship 1966
- Kildare Junior Football Championship (5) 1946, 1964, 2009, 2014, 2022
- Jack Higgins Cup (1) 1964
- Kildare Junior A Football Championship: 1964
- Kildare Junior B F Championship (4) 1959, 1986, 2001, 2008
- Kildare Intermediate Football League (3) 1937, 1960, 1964
- Kildare Junior Football League 1929, 1937
- Kildare Junior Camogie Championship 1962 (combined with Straffan),
- Kildare Junior Camogie Championship 1994
- Kildare Junior Camogie League (2) 1993, 1994

=== As St Wolstan’s F team with Celbridge ===
- Kildare Senior Football Championship Semi-finalists 1972 and 1975 (beaten in replays on both occasions)
- Kildare Under–21 Football Championship 1985
- The Leinster Leader Junior Club Cup 2004
- Kildare Junior A Football Championship Winners 2009
- Dowling Cup Champions 2007, 2009
- Kildare Under 21-B Football Championship 2009 (St.Edwards)
- Kildare Minor C Football Championship (1) 2009

== Bibliography ==
- Cradle Days And Winning Ways - A Centenary History Of Straffan GFC 1886–1986 by Hilary Allen:. (Maynooth, Published By Straffan GFC 1986), 76pp.
- Kildare GAA: A Centenary History, by Eoghan Corry, CLG Chill Dara, 1984, ISBN 0-9509370-0-2 hb ISBN 0-9509370-1-0 pb
- Kildare GAA yearbook, 1972, 1974, 1978, 1979, 1980 and 2000- in sequence especially the Millennium yearbook of 2000
- Soaring Sliothars: Centenary of Kildare Camogie 1904-2004 by Joan O'Flynn Kildare County Camogie Board.
