= Athgarvan GAA =

Gaelic games club in County Kildare, Ireland

- Ath Garbhán
- Founded: 1889
- County: Kildare
- Colours: Light Blue and White
- Grounds: Athgarvan GAA Grounds, Athgarvan
- Coordinates: 53.1489°N 6.8006°W

Playing kits
Standard colours

Athgarvan is a Gaelic Athletic Association (GAA) club in Athgarvan, County Kildare, Ireland.

== History ==
In Gaelic football, Athgarvan contested the first junior C final in 1975, and won the competition in 1977.

Eyrefield competed in several hurling championships in the 1910s.

In ladies football, Athgarvan reached the All Ireland junior club final in 2005, losing to Mourneabbey of Cork by 2–11 to 2–7.

== Honours ==
- Kildare Senior Football Championship (0): (semi-finalists in 1895)
- Kildare Junior Football Championship (2): 1927, 1956
- Kildare Junior Football League (1): 1961
- Kildare Junior C Football Championship (3): 1976, 1989, 2009

== Bibliography ==
- Kildare GAA: A Centenary History, by Eoghan Corry, CLG Chill Dara, 1984, ISBN 978-0-9509370-0-7 hb ISBN 978-0-9509370-1-4 pb
- Kildare GAA yearbook, 1972, 1974, 1978, 1979, 1980 and 2000- in sequence especially the Millennium yearbook of 2000
- Soaring Sliothars: Centenary of Kildare Camogie 1904-2004 by Joan O'Flynn Kildare County Camogie Board.
