= Cappagh GAA =

Gaelic games club in County Kildare, Ireland

Cappagh
- Ceapach
- Founded: 1917
- County: Kildare
- Colours: Red and White horizontal stripes
- Grounds: Tadhg Downey Park, Ballyvoneen, Cloncurry
- Coordinates: 53.407819°N 6.787787°W

Playing kits
Standard colours

Cappagh is a Gaelic Athletic Association (GAA) club in County Kildare, Ireland. It was the Kildare club of the year in 1998.

== History ==
Cappagh was founded in 1917. Their grounds in Newtown, south of Cappagh, were purchased in 1971 and their dressing room complex opened in 1995.

== Gaelic football ==
Kerryman Tadhg Downey played at corner forward on the 1939 Kildare championship team. At his behest, Cappagh adopted the red jerseys of the Dingle club, worn by Kerry in the 1938 All Ireland final. They amalgamated with Kilcock 1938-41 and 1955-62.

== Hurling ==
The club plays hurling from under-15's down to "nursery". Hurling was introduced at "nursery" level in 2010. They won their first hurling trophy in Division 4 of the U12s in 2015. They were also named "hurling club of the year" by Kildare north Board. This was followed up with the U12 team winning Division 2 in 2016 and being promoted to Division 1 for the following year. In 2016, Cappagh amalgamated with Broadford at U14, under the name "Northern Gaels". They played in Féile and lost to Celbridge in the final and went on to win the shield final against Celbridge. The Northern Gaels followed this up with winning the shield final in the u15 in Autumn 2016.

== Camogie ==
The Cappagh camogie club was founded in 1972. The original club colours were grey and white - now grey red and white. Cappagh hosted the National League Division 2 final of 1980. In 1978 they became the first club in Kildare to achieve the Kildare Senior Camogie Championship- Kildare Junior Camogie Championship double.

== Honours ==
- Kildare Intermediate Football Championship (1) 1946 Finalists 1944
- Leinster Leader Cup Finalists 1946
- Kildare Junior B Football Championship (2) 1975, 1990 Finalists 1978
- Kildare Junior Football Championship Finalists 1942, 2015
- Kildare Senior Football League Division 3: Champions (1) 1977
- Kildare Junior C Football Championship (1) 1975
- Kildare Junior 7-A-Side Championship (1) 2005
- The Leinster Leader Junior Club Cup (2) 1997, 2006
- Féile DivC Football Champions 2011
- Kildare Camogie Under-21 Championship (1) 2015
- Kildare Camogie senior shield Championship (1) 2015.

== Bibliography ==
- Kildare GAA: A Centenary History, by Eoghan Corry, CLG Chill Dara, 1984, ISBN 0-9509370-0-2 hb ISBN 0-9509370-1-0 pb
- Kildare GAA yearbook, 1972, 1974, 1978, 1979, 1980 and 2000- in sequence especially the Millennium yearbook of 2000
- Soaring Sliothars: Centenary of Kildare Camogie 1904-2004 by Joan O'Flynn Kildare County Camogie Board.
