= Suncroft GFC =

Gaelic games club in County Kildare, Ireland

Suncroft
- Crochta na Gréine
- Founded: 1929
- County: Kildare
- Nickname: The Croft
- Colours: Green and Red
- Grounds: Suncroft Community Field, Askinraw Lane, Suncroft
- Coordinates: 53.1064°N 6.8583°W

Playing kits
Standard colours

Senior Club Championships
	All Ireland	Leinster champions	Kildare champions
Hurling:	-	-	1

Suncroft is a Gaelic football club in Suncroft, County Kildare, Ireland, winner of the day Senior Hurling championship in 1974 and the Senior Football League in 1952. Paul Doyle was selected on the Kildare Gaelic football team of the millennium. Anthony Rainbow was an All Stars Award winner in 2000.

== History ==
In 2009, Suncroft completed one of the biggest shocks in the Kildare Senior Football Championship by beating the highly fancied Sarsfields by 2-12 to 0-15 at St Conleths Park.

== Honours ==
- Kildare Senior Hurling Championship: Winners 1974.
- Kildare Senior Football League (1) 1952
- Kildare Senior Football Championship Semi-finalists 1995, 2009
- Kildare Intermediate Football Championship (4) 1944, 1950, 1989, 2007
- Kildare Junior A Football Championship: 1977
- Kildare Junior Football Championship: 1930, 1962
- Kildare Minor B Football Championship 2015
- Kildare Minor Football Championship (3) 1944, 1948, 1949
- Keogh Cup Champions 2003

== Bibliography ==
- Kildare GAA: A Centenary History, by Eoghan Corry, CLG Chill Dara, 1984, ISBN 0-9509370-0-2 hb ISBN 0-9509370-1-0 pb
- Kildare GAA yearbook, 1972, 1974, 1978, 1979, 1980 and 2000- in sequence especially the Millennium yearbook of 2000
- Soaring Sliothars: Centenary of Kildare Camogie 1904-2004 by Joan O'Flynn Kildare County Camogie Board.
