= Clogherinkoe GFC =

Gaelic games club in County Kildare, Ireland

Clogherinkoe
- Cloch an Rince
- Founded: 1954
- County: Kildare
- Colours: Yellow and Black
- Grounds: Balrinnet, Carbury
- Coordinates: 53.390521°N 6.996789°W

Playing kits
Standard colours

Clogherinkoe GFC is a Gaelic football club in County Kildare, Ireland, the first junior C champions to qualify for the Jack Higgins Cup final. They formed an area team with Johnstownbridge, St John's, which reached the semi-final of the senior football championship in 1978. Padraig Gravin was corner-forward on the 1998 Kildare All Ireland final team. Pat Tyrrell was a noted Kildare forward in the 1960s. John Lowry and John Donoghue were major players for the team throughout the 80's and 90's. Both played on the Kildare senior team for several seasons. These days the club now includes well known names such Aedan Boyle and Jack Robinson. Won an intermediate final v Kilcock in 2020 under the management of Ronan Quinn, Seamus Galligan and Jim Kelly. Currently competing at senior level under the new management of Mark Murnaghan. Amalgamated at underage with Johnstownbridge to form Balyna Juvenile Club.

== History ==
Clogherinkoe was founded in 1954 by Jimmy Donoghue and Davey Doran and won a Junior B championship within three years. They played in McKeever's field in Broadford until 1980, when they combined with Broadford hurlers to purchase a field, located in Balrinnet townland, 2 km southwest of Clogharinka village.

== Gaelic football ==
Clogherinkoe were the first junior C champions to qualify for the Jack Higgins Cup final in 1977 when they beat Clane's Junior B team in the semi-final, having previously been the second team to lose the Jack Higgins Cup final as Junior A champions, and lost the final again in 1984 as Junior A champions before eventually succeeding at the fourth attempt in 1998. They won an Intermediate League double in 1962-'63. Won a Junior championship in 2012 and won an Intermediate Championship in 2020.

== Hurling ==
Clogherinkoe players play hurling with Broadford.

== Honours ==
- Kildare Intermediate Football Championship: 2020
- Kildare Junior A Football Championship: (4) 1963, 1984, 1998, 2012
- Kildare Junior B Football Championship (1) 1957
- Kildare Senior Football League Division 2 (1) 2016
- Kildare Intermediate Football League Winners 1962, 1963
- Jack Higgins Cup Winners 1998

== Bibliography ==
- Kildare GAA: A Centenary History, by Eoghan Corry, CLG Chill Dara, 1984, ISBN 0-9509370-0-2 hb ISBN 0-9509370-1-0 pb
- Kildare GAA yearbook, 1972, 1974, 1978, 1979, 1980 and 2000- in sequence especially the Millennium yearbook of 2000
- Soaring Sliothars: Centenary of Kildare Camogie 1904-2004 by Joan O'Flynn Kildare County Camogie Board.
