= Rathangan GAA =

Gaelic sports club in County Kildare, Ireland

Rathangan
- Rath Iomgháin
- Founded: 1889
- County: Kildare
- Nickname: The Burrow
- Colours: Green and White
- Grounds: Newtown, Rathangan
- Coordinates: 53.226539°N 6.990137°W

Playing kits
Standard colours

Senior Club Championships
	All Ireland	Leinster champions	Kildare champions
Football:	-	-	1
Hurling:	-	-	1

Rathangan GAA is a Gaelic games club based in Rathangan, County Kildare, Ireland. In more recent times, Rathangan GAA have been selected to play in the very successful RTÉ production Celebrity Bainisteoir. They were managed by Today FM DJ Ray D'Arcy as part of the RTE series, Celebrity Bainisteoir season 2.

== Honours ==
- Kildare Senior Football Championship: (1) 1925
- Leinster Leader Cup (3): 1922, 1925, 2006
- Kildare Intermediate Football League (1): 1969
- Kildare Intermediate Football Championship (4): 1941, 1981, 1993, 2001
- Kildare Junior Football Championship: (3): 1920, 1938, 1970
- Kildare Senior Football League Division 1 (1): 2006
