= Eadestown GAA =

Irish Gaelic games club

Eadestown
- Baile Éide
- Founded: 1884
- County: Kildare
- Nickname: Eadestown GAA
- Colours: Sky Blue and Navy Blue
- Grounds: Eadestown
- Coordinates: 53.198012°N 6.585917°W

Playing kits
Standard colours

Eadestown is a Gaelic Athletic Association (GAA) club in County Kildare, Ireland based in the smallest parish in the diocese of Dublin. Previously, Ballymore Eustace and Eadestown combined for minor purposes under the name Oliver Plunkett's. However, since 2012, Eadestown have fielded their own minor team.

== History ==
Royal Irish Constabulary (RIC) records from 1890 show that Eadestown Seaghan O'Neills had 40 members. Between 1910 and 1912 the name of the team was changed from Rathmore Rovers to Eadestown.

2005 saw the installation of floodlights, nets behind goals, pitch drainage system and a path around the pitch. In 2006, wooden railings, a large advertising hoarding, a sign at the entrance and a digital scoreboard were added.

== Honours ==
- Kildare Senior Football Championship: (1) 1970
- All-Ireland Junior Ladies Club Football Championship (1) 2006

== Notable players ==
- Larry Tompkins, member of the Kildare Gaelic Football team of the millennium
- Emmet Bolton
- Larry Coughlan, Offaly All-Ireland winning player
