= 2026 Kildare Senior Football Championship =

Gaelic football championship in Ireland

133rd Kildare Senior Football Championship

Tournament details
- County: Kildare
- Province: Leinster
- Year: 2026
- Trophy: Dermot Bourke Cup
- Sponsor: Joe Mallon Motors
- Date: 21 August 2026 - 1 November 2026
- Teams: 16
- Defending champions: Athy

Winners
- Champions: Sarsfields (26th win)
- Manager: Vinnie Walsh
- Captain: Barry Coffey

Runners-up
- Runners-up: Maynooth
- Manager: Ross Glavin
- Captain: Ciarán Flanagan

Promotion/Relegation
- Relegated team(s): Allenwood

Other
- Matches played: 41
- Website: Kildare GAA

The 2026 Kildare Senior Football Championship is the 133rd edition of the Kildare GAA's premier club Gaelic football tournament for senior graded teams in County Kildare, Ireland. The tournament consists of 16 teams with the winner going on to represent Kildare in the Leinster Senior Club Football Championship. The championship will begin with a group stage sorted by an open draw (excluding 4 teams) followed by a knockout stage.

Athy are the defending champions this year after defeating Naas to win their 8th championship and their first since 2020.

Sallins returned to the senior grade for the first time since 2003 after defeating St Laurence's in the 2025 Kildare Intermediate Football Championship final. This was at the cost of Confey, who were defeated by Allenwood in the Relegation Play-off to be relegated to the Kildare I.F.C for the first time since 2011.

== Championship structure ==
Following the meeting of the Kildare GAA County Board on Tuesday 3 February, a proposal to revamp the senior, intermediate and junior football championships were passed unanimously.

The following changes were made:

- The preliminary quarter-finals will be discontinued and the four semi-finalists from the previous year's championship will be seeded.
- There will be no preliminary round, instead heading straight into the Round Robin Group Stage. The Group Stage will consist of four groups (Group A, B, C & D), and each of these groups will consist of 4 teams. The four semi-finalists from the last year's championship will be seeded into each of the 4 groups, will the other 12 teams will be open draw into the groups.
- The 1st and 2nd placed teams progress into the Quarter-finals. 1st placed teams will be drawn randomly against 2nd placed teams with no repeat pairings from the group stage. The winners of these quarter-finals will progress to the semi-finals with no repeat pairings, and the winners will progress to the final.
- The 3rd and 4th placed teams progress to the Senior A Quarter-finals. 3rd placed teams will be drawn randomly against 4th placed teams with no repeat parings from the group stage. The winners of the Senior A quarter-finals progress to the Senior A semi-finals with the same permutations as with the Senior A quarter-finals. The winner progress to the Senior A final.
- The losers of the Senior A quarter-finals will progress to the Relegation Semi-finals, also with no repeat pairings. The losers of the relegation semi-finals will contest a relegation final to secure their senior status.

== Team Changes ==
The following teams have changed division since the 2025 championship season:

=== To S.F.C. ===
Promoted from 2025 I.F.C.

- Sallins - (Intermediate Champions)

=== From S.F.C. ===
Relegated to 2026 I.F.C.

- Confey

== Participating teams ==
The 16 teams that will participate in the 2026 Kildare S.F.C are:

Club	Location	Manager	Pre C'ship Odds	2025 Championship Position	2026 Championship Position	In championship since	Championship Titles	Last Championship Title
Allenwood	Allenwood	Mark Murnaghan	200/1	Relegation Finalist	Relegated to Intermediate	2024	1	2004
Athy	Athy	Seán Gannon	4/1	Champions	Quarter-Finalist	1975	8	2025
Caragh	Prosperous	Michael Browne	50/1	Quarter-Finalist	Relegation Semi-Finalist	2025	3	1926
Carbury	Carbury	Andrew Dermody	150/1	Non-Qualifier	Relegation Semi-Finalist	1931	11	1985
Celbridge	Celbridge	Alan Costello	9/2	Semi-Finalist	Semi-Finalist	2003	1	2008
Clane	Clane	Seán Mealiffe	20/1	Quarter-Finalist	Senior A Champions	1950	17	1997
Clogherinkoe	Clogherinkoe	Jarlath Gilroy	150/1	Non-Qualifier	Senior A Semi-Finalist	2021	0	—
Eadestown	Eadestown	Emmet Bolton	100/1	Preliminary Quarter-Finalist	Senior A Runners-Up	2015	1	1970
Johnstownbridge	Johnstownbridge	Aidan Dunne	50/1	Quarter-Finalist	Quarter-Finalist	2014	3	1989
Kilcock	Kilcock	Declan Gibbons	200/1	Non-Qualifier	Relegation Finalist	2022	5	1958
Maynooth	Maynooth	Ross Glavin	20/1	Preliminary Quarter-Finalist	Runners-Up	2010	2	1913
Moorefield	Newbridge	Frank Hanniffy	20/1	Quarter-Finalist	Quarter-Finalist	1940	10	2018
Naas	Naas	Jimmy Higgins	Evens	Runners-Up	Semi-Finalist	2005	12	2024
Sallins	Sallins	Johnny McNulty	16/1	I.F.C Champions	Senior A Semi-Finalist	2026	0	—
Sarsfields	Newbridge	Vinny Walsh	3/1	Semi-Finalist	Champions	Never Relegated	25	2019
Raheens	Caragh	Anthony Rainbow	33/1	Non-Qualifier	Quarter-Finalist	2018	10	1981

== Group Stage ==
As last year's semi-finalists were Celbridge, Sarsfields, Athy and Naas, those four teams were seeded into Group A, B. C and D respectively. The draw for the group stage was conducted on 15 May 2026, and the fixtures for those group stage games were released on 10 June 2026.

=== Group A ===
Advance to Quarter-Finals Advance to Senior A Championship

Team	Matches				Score			Pts
Team	Pld	W	D	L	For	Against	Diff	Pts
Celbridge	3	3	0	0	77	49	+28	6
Johnstownbridge	3	1	1	1	57	48	+9	3
Clane	3	1	1	1	58	52	+6	3
Allenwood	3	0	0	3	41	84	-43	0

==== Round 1 ====
21 August 2026 Round 1	Clane	2-12 (18) – (18) 1-15	Johnstownbridge	Newbridge
20:00 IST (UTC+1)		(HT: 1-06 – 0-07)		Venue: Manguard Park
	Pts: Shane O'Sullivan 1-4 (1tpf), Adam Fitzpatrick 0-4, Cian O'Donoghue 1-0, Sam Reilly 0-2, Daragh Mullahy 0-1, Brian McLoughlin 0-1 (f)	Report	Pts: Shane Flynn 0-4, Daniel Flynn 0-3, Darragh Sloane 0-3 (1tp), Connor Flynn 1-0, Paul Cribbon 0-2 (2f), Luke O'Connor 0-1, Luke Flynn 0-1, Joey Higgins 0-1	Referee: Fergus Devereux

22 August 2026 Round 1	Allenwood	1-11 (14) – (40) 6-22	Celbridge	Clane
17:00 IST (UTC+1)		(HT: 0-04 – 3-10)		Venue: Conneff Park
	Pts: Eoin Bagnall 0-6 (1tpf, 4f), Cormac Denagher 1-0, Darragh Malone 0-2, Jamie Gartland 0-1, Brendan Hanafey 0-1, Johnny Byrne 0-1	Report	Pts: Aaron Browne 1-5 (1tp, 1f), Peter McAteer 2-0, Killian Browne 1-2 (tp), James Dolan 1-2, Luke Murray 0-4, Paddy Wall 1-0, Shane McNamara 0-3 (1tpf, 1f), Kevin Flynn 0-2, Davy Hughes 0-2, Mick O'Grady 0-1, Niall O'Regan 0-1	Referee: Alan Archbold

==== Round 2 ====
6 September 2026 Round 2	Allenwood	1-13 (16) – (23) 2-17	Clane	Newbridge
15:45 IST (UTC+1)		(HT: 0-05 – 1-07)		Venue: Cedral St Conleth's
	Pts: Eoin Bagnall 0-5 (1tp, 3f), Darragh Malone 0-4 (2tp), Johnny Byrne 0-4 (1tp), Eric Judge 1-0	Report	Pts: Adam Fitzpatrick 2-5 (1tp), Killian O'Sullivan 0-4 (2tp), Brian McLoughlin 0-2, Shane O'Sullivan 0-2 (1f), Harry O'Neill 0-1, Darragh Mullahy 0-1, Daniel Colbert 0-1, Sam McCormack 0-1	Referee: Niall Colgan

6 September 2026 Round 2	Celbridge	1-16 (19) – (18) 1-15	Johnstownbridge	Newbridge
17:00 IST (UTC+1)		(HT: 0-10 – 0-08)		Venue: Manguard Park
	Pts: Peter McAteer 1-0, Paddy Wall 0-3, Aaron Browne 0-3 (1f), Luke Murray 0-3, Kevin O'Callaghan 0-2, Fergal Conway 0-2, Liam O'Flynn 0-1, James Dolan 0-1, Dean O'Donoghue 0-1	Report	Pts: Darragh Sloane 0-6 (3tp), Sam Doran 0-5 (2tp), Daniel Flynn 1-0, Paul Cribben 0-3, Kelvin McNally 0-1 (f)	Referee: Brendan Cawley

==== Round 3 ====
18 September 2026 Round 3	Allenwood	0-11 (11) – (21) 2-15	Johnstownbridge	Newbridge
20:00 IST (UTC+1)				Venue: Manguard Park

18 September 2026 Round 3	Celbridge	1-15 (18) – (17) 0-17	Clane	Newbridge
20:00 IST (UTC+1)				Venue: Cedral St Conleth's

=== Group B ===
Advance to Quarter-Finals Advance to Senior A Championship

Team	Matches				Score			Pts
Team	Pld	W	D	L	For	Against	Diff	Pts
Sarsfields	3	3	0	0	71	48	+23	6
Maynooth	3	2	0	1	62	50	+12	4
Caragh	3	1	0	2	41	59	-18	2
Carbury	3	0	0	3	43	60	-17	0

==== Round 1 ====
22 August 2026 Round 1	Carbury	1-12 (15) – (24) 1-21	Sarsfields	Newbridge
14:00 IST (UTC+1)		(HT: 0-04 – 1-11)		Venue: Manguard Park
	Pts: Eoin Cully 0-10 (5f, 1tpf), Aaron O'Neill 1-0, James Carey 0-2 (tp)	Report	Pts: Barry Coffey 0-6 (1tp, 3f), Karl Hartley 0-4, Ryan Kearney 0-4 (1tp), Shea Ryan 1-0, Matty Byrne 0-2, Con Kavanagh 0-1, Ben McCormack 0-1, Daragh Conlon 0-1, Cian Costigan 0-1, Conor O'Donovan 0-1	Referee: Conor Daly

22 August 2026 Round 1	Caragh	0-10 (10) – (24) 2-18	Maynooth	Newbridge
15:30 IST (UTC+1)		(HT: 0-04 – 1-13)		Venue: Cedral St Conleth's
	Pts: Daragh Swords 0-3 (1tpf, 1f), Ryan Burke 0-2 (tp), Ronan Doorey 0-3, Liam Blake 0-1, Ruadhan Kane 0-1, Eoghan O'Haire 0-1 (f)	Report	Pts: Paddy Mahoney 1-3 (2f), Seán Hever 0-6 (2tp), Ciaran Flanagan 1-1, Matthew Diamond 0-2 (1f), Chris Canning 0-2, Mark Donnellan 0-1 ('45), Kevin Donovan 0-1, Paul Maguire 0-1, Paddy Ryan 0-1	Referee: Henry Barrett

==== Round 2 ====
4 September 2026 Round 2	Caragh	2-07 (13) – (21) 1-18	Sarsfields	Newbridge
19:45 IST (UTC+1)		(HT: 1-03 – 0-10)		Venue: Cedral St Conleth's
	Pts: Darragh Swords 0-7 (2tp, 2f), Dan Lynam 1-0, Kevin Campbell 1-0	Report	Pts: Cian Costigan 0-7 (1tpf, 1tp, 2f), Conor Donovan 1-2, Cathal White 0-4, Cathal Moore 0-2 (tpf), Ryan Kearney 0-1, Barry Coffey 0-1, Ben McCormack 0-1	Referee: Kieran Harris

5 September 2026 Round 2	Carbury	1-11 (14) – (18) 1-15	Maynooth	Newbridge
17:15 IST (UTC+1)		(HT: 0-06 – 0-10)		Venue: Cedral St Conleth's
	Pts: Eoin Cully 1-7 (1tpf, 2f), Tommy Gill 0-2 (tp), Aaron O'Neill 0-1, Jack Smyth 0-1	Report	Pts: Paddy Mahoney 0-6 (3f), Matthew Redmond 0-5 (1tpf, 1tp), Kevin Donovan 1-1, Liam McDonald 0-1, Niall O'Sullivan 0-1, Chris Canning 0-1	Referee: Ken Doyle

==== Round 3 ====
19 September 2026 Round 3	Maynooth	1-17 (20) – (26) 3-17	Sarsfields	Newbridge
15:00 IST (UTC+1)				Venue: Cedral St Conleth's

19 September 2026 Round 3	Caragh	2-12 (18) – (14) 2-08	Carbury	Newbridge
15:00 IST (UTC+1)				Venue: Manguard Park

=== Group C ===
Advance to Quarter-Finals Advance to Senior A Championship

Team	Matches				Score			Pts
Team	Pld	W	D	L	For	Against	Diff	Pts
Athy	3	2	1	0	55	44	+11	5
Raheens	3	1	1	1	49	48	+1	3
Sallins	3	1	0	2	49	49	0	2
Kilcock	3	1	0	2	40	52	-12	2

==== Round 1 ====
22 August 2026 Round 1	Raheens	1-14 (17) – (15) 0-15	Sallins	Newbridge
17:00 IST (UTC+1)		(HT: 0-05 – 0-09)		Venue: Cedral St Conleth's
	Pts: Paddy Woodgate 0-6 (2tp), Rob Thompson 0-5 (3f), Jack Taffee 1-0, Luke O'Donovan 0-2, Gavin Thompson 0-1	Report	Pts: Colm Dalton 0-6, Cian Grimes 0-3 (1tp, 1f), Stephen Kelly 0-2 (tp), James Dalton 0-2, Alan Marshall 0-1, Luke Killian 0-1	Referee: Brendan Cawley

23 August 2026 Round 1	Athy	0-20 (20) – (10) 0-10	Kilcock	Newbridge
15:45 IST (UTC+1)		(HT: 0-08 – 0-04)		Venue: Cedral St Conleth's
	Pts: Niall Kelly 0-6 (2f), Ronan Kelly 0-3, Calum Keaveney 0-3 (1'45), Seán Moore 0-2, David Hyland 0-2, Kevin Feely 0-2, Cathal McCann 0-1, Cian Keaveney 0-1	Report	Pts: Danny Maguire 0-4 (1f), Shane O'Rourke 0-2 (tp), Adam Doyle 0-1, Mark Gibbons 0-1, Brendan Gibbons 0-1, Danny Byrne 0-1 (f)	Referee: Fergal Barry

==== Round 2 ====
6 September 2026 Round 2	Athy	1-15 (18) – (17) 1-14	Sallins	Newbridge
14:00 IST (UTC+1)		(HT: 0-07 – 1-12)		Venue: Cedral St Conleth's
	Pts: Calum Keaveny 0-3, Paudi Behan 1-0, Kevin Feely 0-3 (1tp), Niall Kelly 0-3 (2f), Ronan Kelly 0-2, Seán Moore 0-2 (1'45), Cian Keaveney 0-2	Report	Pts: Colm Dalton 1-5, Cian Grimes 0-6 (2tp, 1'45, 1f), James Dalton 0-2, Paul Farrelly 0-1	Referee: Ryan Moran

6 September 2026 Round 2	Kilcock	0-16 (16) – (15) 0-15	Raheens	Newbridge
15:30 IST (UTC+1)		(HT: 0-08 – 0-05)		Venue: Manguard Park
	Pts: Finn Dowling 0-6 (2tpf), Shane O'Rourke 0-5 (2f), Brendan Gibbons 0-1, Danny Byrne 0-1, Danny Maguire 0-1, Andy Dalton 0-1, Mark Gibbons 0-1	Report	Pts: Paddy Woodgate 0-8 (2tp, 1tpf, 1'45, 1f), Rob Thompson 0-3 (2f), Niall Dolan 0-2 (tp), Conor Kelly 0-1, Luke O'Donovan 0-1	Referee: Colm Kearney

==== Round 3 ====
20 September 2026 Round 3	Kilcock	1-11 (14) – (17) 1-14	Sallins	Newbridge
17:00 IST (UTC+1)				Venue: Manguard Park

20 September 2026 Round 3	Athy	1-14 (17) – (17) 2-11	Raheens	Newbridge
17:00 IST (UTC+1)				Venue: Cedral St Conleth's

=== Group D ===
Advance to Quarter-Finals Advance to Senior A Championship

Team	Matches				Score			Pts
Team	Pld	W	D	L	For	Against	Diff	Pts
Naas	3	3	0	0	75	44	+31	6
Moorefield	3	1	1	1	50	48	+2	3
Eadestown	3	1	0	2	48	67	-19	2
Clogherinkoe	3	0	1	2	51	65	-14	1

==== Round 1 ====
21 August 2026 Round 1	Moorefield	1-13 (16) – (18) 0-18	Naas	Newbridge
19:45 IST (UTC+1)		(HT: 0-04 – 0-11)		Venue: Cedral St Conleth's
	Pts: Aaron Masterson 1-1 (1'45), Evan O'Brien 0-4 (3f), Kevin Murnaghan 0-2 (1f), Aaron Martin 0-2 (tp), Mark Murray 0-2 (1f), Ryan Moore 0-1, Tommy Rooney 0-1	Report	Pts: Alex Beirne 0-6 (1tp, 1tpf, 1f), Darragh Kirwan 0-5 (1tp, 1f), Euan Cowzer 0-2, Ciaran Doyle 0-2, Paddy McDermott 0-1, Dermor Hanafin 0-1, Kevin Cummins 0-1	Referee: Kieran Harris

22 August 2026 Round 1	Clogherinkoe	1-17 (20) – (21) 3-12	Eadestown	Newbridge
18:30 IST (UTC+1)		(HT: 1-10 – 2-04)		Venue: Manguard Park
	Pts: Jack Robinson 0-7 (1tpf, 5f), Jimmy Lynch 0-5 (1tp, 1'45, 2f), Cein McMonagle 1-1, Rian Cully 0-2 (tp), Mark Nolan 0-1, Joe McIlduff 0-1	Report	Pts: Ben Fitzsimons 1-4, Michael O'Brien 1-1, Daragh Jameson 1-0, Charlie Carroll 0-2 (tpf), Cian Boran 0-1, Conan Boran 0-1, Eoin Conneff 0-1, Cian Bolton 0-1, Conor McCarthy 0-1	Referee: Ken Doyle

==== Round 2 ====
5 September 2026 Round 2	Clogherinkoe	2-14 (20) – (20) 0-20	Moorefield	Newbridge
15:00 IST (UTC+1)		(HT: 2-06 – 0-10)		Venue: Manguard Park
	Pts: Jack Robinson 1-5 (1f), Jimmy Lynch 1-4 (2f), Mark Nolan 0-3 (1tp), Cein McMonagle0-1, Mark Grehan 0-1	Report	Pts: Ryan Moore 0-5 (1tp), Evan O'Brien 0-5 (4f), Mark Murray 0-5 (1tp), Luke Sweeney 0-2 (tp), Tommy McGrath 0-1, Tommy Rooney 0-1, Aaron Martin 0-1	Referee: Alan Archbold

5 September 2026 Round 2	Eadestown	1-14 (17) – (33) 4-21	Naas	Newbridge
15:30 IST (UTC+1)		(HT: 0-11 – 2-08)		Venue: Cedral St Conleth's
	Pts: Ben Fitzsimons 1-3 (1pen, 1tpf, 1f), Charlie Carroll 0-4 (2tpf), Jack Sargent 0-2 (tp), Daragh Jameson 0-1, Rian Boran 0-1, Conan Boran 0-1, Eoin Conneff 0-1, Conor McCarthy 0-1	Report	Pts: Daragh Kirwan 1-8 (2tp), Ciaran Doyle 1-1, Dermot Hanafin 1-0, Jack McKevitt 1-0, Alex Beirne 0-3 (1f), Euan Cowzer 0-3, Paul McDermott 0-2 (tp), Paddy McDermott 0-1, Ryan Sinkey 0-1, Fintan Quinn 0-1, Luke Mullins 0-1 ('45)	Referee: Fergus Devereux

==== Round 3 ====
19 September 2026 Round 3	Eadestown	0-10 (10) – (14) 1-11	Moorefield	Newbridge
16:45 IST (UTC+1)				Venue: Cedral St Conleth's

19 September 2026 Round 3	Clogherinkoe	0-11 (11) – (24) 1-21	Naas	Newbridge
16:45 IST (UTC+1)				Venue: Manguard Park

== Knock-out Stage ==
=== Senior A Championship ===
==== Senior A Quarter-Finals ====
The 3rd and 4th placed teams from the group stage are placed into the "B" quarter-finals where they are drawn randomly against one another (no repeat pairings). The winners progress to the "B" semi-finals while the losers progress to the Relegation Semi-finals.

3 October 2026 Senior A Quarter-Final	Clane	2-17 (23) – (19) 1-16	Carbury	Kildare
16:00 IST (UTC+1)				Venue: St Brigid's Park

4 October 2026 Senior A Quarter-Final	Sallins	1-17 (20) – (15) 1-12	Allenwood	Clane
13:00 IST (UTC+1)				Venue: Conneff Park

4 October 2026 Senior A Quarter-Final	Caragh	1-14 (17) – (18) 0-18	Clogherinkoe	Newbridge
13:00 IST (UTC+1)				Venue: Manguard Park

4 October 2026 Senior A Quarter-Final	Eadestown	0-20 (20) – (18) 2-12	Kilcock	Clane
15:00 IST (UTC+1)				Venue: Conneff Park

==== Senior A Semi-Finals ====
The "B" quarter-final winners are drawn against each other with no repeat pairings allowed. The winners progress to the "B" final.

16 October 2026 Senior A Semi-Final	Eadestown	1-13 (16) – (15) 1-12	Sallins	Kildare
20:00 IST (UTC+1)				Venue: St Brigid's Park

17 October 2026 Senior A Semi-Final	Clogherinkoe	1-18 (21) – (30) 3-21	Clane	Newbridge
16:00 IST (UTC+1)				Venue: Manguard Park

==== Senior A Final ====
20 October 2026 Senior A Final	Eadestown	3-19 (28) – (31) 3-22 (a.e.t.)	Clane	Newbridge
20:00 GMT (UTC+0)				Venue: Cedral St Conleth's

=== Relegation Series ===
==== Relegation Semi-Finals ====
The losers of the "B" quarter-finals are drawn against each other with no repeat pairings allowed. The losers progress to the relegation final where the two teams will contest against one another for the right to stay within the S.F.C.

16 October 2026 Relegation Semi-Final 1	Carbury	2-13 (19) – (9) 0-09	Allenwood	Newbridge
20:00 IST (UTC+1)				Venue: Manguard Park

17 October 2026 Relegation Semi-Final 2	Caragh	1-11 (14) – (11) 0-11	Kilcock	Newbridge
14:00 IST (UTC+1)				Venue: Manguard Park

==== Relegation Final ====
31 October 2026 Relegation Final	Allenwood	0-14 (14) – (17) 2-11	Kilcock	Newbridge
18:00 GMT (UTC+0)				Venue: Manguard Park

=== Quarter-Finals ===
Quarter-finals
3 October, Newbridge
Celbridge	0-13
Raheens	0-10
4 October, Newbridge
Sarsfields	1-20
Moorefield	1-07
3 October, Newbridge
Athy	0-11
Maynooth (AET)	1-10
4 October, Newbridge
Naas	2-17
Johnstownbridge	1-15

Semi-finals
18 October, Newbridge
Celbridge	2-09
Sarsfields	2-17
17 October, Newbridge
Maynooth (AET)	1-15
Naas	0-16

Final
1 November, Newbridge
Sarsfields	1-14
Maynooth	1-10

The 1st and 2nd placed teams are placed into the quarter-finals where they are drawn randomly against each other (no repeat pairings). The winners progress to the semi finals.

3 October 2026 Quarter-Final 1	Celbridge	0-13 (13) – (10) 0-10	Raheens	Newbridge
16:00 IST (UTC+1)		(HT: 0-06 – 0-04)		Venue: Cedral St Conleth's
	Pts: Killian Browne 0-3, Davy Hughes 0-2, Kevin Flynn 0-2, Dean O'Donoghue 0-1, Tony Archbold 0-1, Fergal Conway 0-1, James Dolan 0-1, Aaron Browne 0-1, Liam O'Flynn 0-1	Report	Pts: Gavin Thompson 0-4 (1tp, 1f), Jack Taafe 0-3, Conor Kelly 0-1, Dara Crowley 0-1, Niall Dolan 0-1	Referee: Kieran Harris

3 October 2026 Quarter-Final 3	Athy	0-11 (11) – (13) 1-10 (a.e.t.)	Maynooth	Newbridge
18:00 IST (UTC+1)		(HT: 0-05 – 1-04) (FT: 0-09 – 1-06)		Venue: Cedral St Conleth's
	Pts: Cathal McCarron 0-2 (tp), Chris Keaveny 0-2, Niall Kelly 0-2 (tp), Kevin Feely 0-2 (1f), Dylan Hyland 0-1, Calum Keaveny 0-1, Ronan Kelly 0-1	Report	Pts: Paddy Mahoney 0-6 (2tpf, 2f), Seán Hever 1-0, Liam McDonald 0-2, Mark Donnellan 0-1 (f), Paddy Ryan 0-1	Referee: Henry Barrett

4 October 2026 Quarter-Final 4	Naas	2-17 (23) – (18) 1-15	Johnstownbridge	Newbridge
14:00 IST (UTC+1)		(HT: 2-06 – 1-04)		Venue: Cedral St Conleth's
	Pts: Alex Beirne 2-4 (1pen, 1tp), Ryan Sinkey 0-5, Euan Cowzer 0-2, Kevin Cummins 0-1, Paddy McDermott 0-1, Darragh Kirwan 0-1, Jack McKevitt 0-1, Cathal Daly 0-1, Ciarán Doyle 0-1	Report	Pts: Daniel Flynn 1-4 (1tp), Sam Doran 0-6 (1'45, 2tpf), Darragh Sloane 0-3 (1tp), Josh O'Donoghue 0-1, Cathal McNally 0-1	Referee: Brendan Cawley

4 October 2026 Quarter-Final 2	Sarsfields	1-20 (23) – (10) 1-07	Moorefield	Newbridge
16:00 IST (UTC+1)		(HT: 0-15 – 1-01)		Venue: Cedral St Conleth's
	Pts: Barry Coffey 0-7 (2tp), Karl Hartley 1-3 (1tp), Cian Costigan 0-2, Luke Mahone 0-2 (tp), Callum Bolton 0-2 (tp), Conor O'Donovan 0-2, Gavin Anderson 0-1, Matty Byrne 0-1	Report	Pts: Tommy Rooney 1-2, Mark Murray 0-3 (1tp), Aaron Martin 0-2 (tp)	Referee: Conor Daly

=== Semi-Finals ===
The quarter-final winners progress to the semi-finals where they are drawn against each other randomly (no repeat pairings). The winners progress to the final.

17 October 2026 Semi-Final 1	Naas	0-16 (16) – (18) 1-15 (a.e.t.)	Maynooth	Newbridge
15:45 IST (UTC+1)		(HT: 0-06 – 0-02) (FT: 0-10 – 0-10)		Venue: Cedral St Conleth's
	Pts: Paul McDermott 0-3, Alex Beirne 0-3 (1tp), Euan Cowzer 0-3, Neil Aherne 0-3, Kevin Cummins 0-1, Ryan Sinkey 0-1	Report	Pts: Cathal McCabe 1-1, Paddy Mahoney 0-4 (1tp, 1f), Seán Hever 0-2, Neil Flynn 0-2 (1f), Matthew Diamond 0-2 (1f), Niall O'Sullivan 0-1, Liam McDonald 0-1, Paddy Ryan 0-1, Kevin Donovan 0-1	Referee: Niall Colgan

18 October 2026 Semi-Final 2	Sarsfields	2-17 (23) – (15) 2-09	Celbridge	Newbridge
13:45 IST (UTC+1)		(HT: 1-06 – 2-07)		Venue: Cedral St Conleth's
	Pts: Luke Mahon 1-2, Karl Hartley 0-4, Daragh Ryan 0-4 (1tp), Colm Harnett 1-0, Barry Coffey 0-2 (1f), Shea Ryan 0-1, Cathal White 0-1, Matty Byrne 0-1, Callum Bolton 0-1, Ryan Kearney 0-1	Report	Pts: Cian Bolger 1-2 (1tp), Cian Powell 1-0, Shane McNamara 0-2 (tpf), Luke Murray 0-2, Kevin Flynn 0-1, Mick Konstantin 0-1, Aaron Browne 0-1 (f)	Referee: Billy O'Connell

=== Final ===
1 November 2026
15:00 GMT (UTC+0)
Final

Maynooth	1-10 (13) – (17) 1-14	Sarsfields

Cedral St Conleth's, Newbridge
