= 2011 O'Byrne Cup =

Tournament details
- Province: Leinster
- Year: 2011
- Trophy: O'Byrne Cup

Winners
- Champions: Kildare (9th win)
- Manager: Kieran McGeeney
- Captain: Éamonn Callaghan

Runners-up
- Runners-up: Louth
- Manager: Peter Fitzpatrick
- Captain: Paddy Keenan

The 2011 O'Byrne Cup was a Gaelic football competition played by the teams of Leinster GAA. The competition differs from the Leinster Senior Football Championship as it also features further education colleges and the winning team does not progress to another tournament at All-Ireland level. The holders of the O'Byrne Cup were DCU. This edition of the O'Byrne Cup began on 9 January 2011.

== O'Byrne Cup ==
First round 9/12/13 January 2011
Westmeath	0-12
Dublin	1-08
Wexford	0-04
D.I.T.	2-18
Kildare	0-16
Longford	0-08
Offaly	0-08
D.C.U.	0-17
Meath	0-10
U.C.D.	1-09
Carlow	5-13
Kilkenny	0-08
Louth	2-15
Athlone I.T.	0-04
Laois	1-09
Wicklow	1-10

Quarter-finals; 16 January 2011
Westmeath	1-09
D.I.T.	0-08
Kildare	1-11
D.C.U.	0-09
U.C.D.	0-13
Carlow	0-10
Louth	2-13
Wicklow	1-12

Semi-finals; 23 January 2011
Westmeath	0-08
Kildare	0-12
U.C.D.	0-16
Louth	2-11

Final; 30 January 2011
Kildare	3-09
Louth	2-09

=== First round ===
The eight winning teams from the first round of the O'Byrne Cup went on to qualify for the quarter finals of the tournament. The losers of the first round went on to the O'Byrne Shield quarter finals. All the first round matches were originally scheduled to take place on 9 January 2011, however several were postponed due to frozen pitched at the scheduled venues.

9 January 2011	Carlow	5-13 - 0-08	Kilkenny	Dr. Cullen Park, Carlow

9 January 2011	Kildare	0-16 - 0-08	Longford	St Conleth's Park, Newbridge

9 January 2011	Laois	1-09 - 1-10	Wicklow	O'Moore Park, Portlaoise

9 January 2011	Louth	2-15 - 0-04	Athlone I.T.	Drogheda

12 January 2011	Meath	0-10 - 1-09	U.C.D.	Pairc Tailteann, Navan

13 January 2011	Offaly	0-08 - 0-17	D.C.U.	Rhode

12 January 2011	Westmeath	0-12 - 1-08	Dublin	Cusack Park, Mullingar

9 January 2011	Wexford	0-04 - 2-18	D.I.T.	Wexford Park, Wexford

=== Quarter-finals ===
16 January 2011	Westmeath	1-09 - 0-08	D.I.T	Athlone

16 January 2011	Kildare	1-11 - 0-09	D.C.U.	St Conleth's Park, Newbridge

16 January 2011	U.C.D.	0-13 - 0-10	Carlow	Tullow

16 January 2011	Louth	2-13 - 1-12	Wicklow	Drogheda

=== Semi-finals ===
23 January 2011	Westmeath	0-08 - 0-12	Kildare	Cusack Park, Mullingar

23 January 2011	U.C.D.	0-16 - 2-11	Louth	Drogheda

=== Final ===
30 January 2011	Kildare	3-09 - 2-09	Louth	St Conleth's Park, Newbridge
	R. Sweeney (pen), K. Cribbin, P. O'Neill 1-0 each, E. O'Flaherty (2f), K. Ennis (2f), A. Smith 0-2 each, D. Whyte ('45), E. Bolton, H. McGrillen 0-1 each		D. Maguire 2-1, S. Lennon 0-7 (6f), P. Keenan 0-1	Referee: G. McCormack (Dublin)

GK	1	Shane Connolly (St Laurence's)
RCB	2	Hugh McGrillen (Celbridge)
FB	3	Michael Foley (Athy)
LCB	4	Ciarán Fitzpatrick (Kilcock)
RHB	5	Emmet Bolton (Eadestown)
CHB	6	Mark Scanlon (Round Towers)
LHB	7	David Whyte (Moorefield)
MF	8	Hugh Lynch (Confey)
MF	9	Pádraig O'Neill (St Laurence's)
RHF	10	Tommy Moolick (Leixlip)
CHF	11	Éamonn Callaghan (Naas)
LHF	12	Eoghan O'Flaherty (Carbury)
RCF	13	Karl Ennis (Maynooth)
FF	14	Willie Heffernan (Nurney)
LCF	15	Alan Smith (Sarsfields)
Substitutes:
	16	Fionn Dowling (Suncroft) for Heffernan
	17	Ronan Sweeney (Moorefield) for Moolick
	18	Keith Cribbin (Johnstownbridge) for Ennis
	19	Brian Flanagan (Johnstownbridge) for Bolton

GK	1	Seán Connor (St Patrick's)
RCB	2	Eamonn McAuley (Na Piarsaigh)
FB	3	Aaron Hoey (St Bride's)
LCB	4	Gerard Hoey (Geraldines)
RHB	5	Ray Finnegan (St Patrick's)
CHB	6	Dessie Finnegan (St Patrick's)
LHB	7	Stephen Fitzpatrick (Clan na Gael)
MF	8	Paddy Keenan (St Patrick's) (c)
MF	9	Ronan Carroll (St Mary's)
RHF	10	Derek Crilly (Dundalk Gaels)
CHF	11	Mark Brennan (Mattock Rangers)
LHF	12	Brian Donnelly (Cooley Kickhams)
RCF	13	Derek Maguire (Dundalk Young Irelands)
FF	14	Shane Lennon (Kilkerley Emmets)
LCF	15	Adrian Reid (Mattock Rangers)
Substitutes:
	16	Andy McDonnell (Newtown Blues) for Donnelly
	17	Ronan Greene (Naomh Malachi) for McAuley
	18	Páraic Smith (Dreadnots) for Reid
	19	JP Rooney (Naomh Máirtín) for Maguire

== O'Byrne Shield ==
The O'Byrne Shield consists of the 8 losing teams from the first round of the O'Byrne Cup.

Quarter-finals; 16 January 2011		Semi-finals; 22 January 2011		Final; 30 January 2011
Dublin	6-10
Wexford	1-08	Dublin	3-13
Longford	1-08	Offaly	0-07
Offaly	1-09			Dublin	2-16
Meath	0-13			Meath	2-14
Kilkenny	1-03	Meath	0-11
Athlone I.T.	0-12	Laois	0-08
Laois	1-11

=== Quarter-finals ===
16 January 2011	Dublin	6-10 - 1-08	Wexford	Parnell Park, Dublin

16 January 2011	Meath	0-13 - 1-03	Kilkenny	Pairc Tailteann, Navan

16 January 2011	Longford	1-08 - 1-09	Offaly	Longford

16 January 2011	Athlone I.T.	0-12 - 1-11	Laois	Portarlington

=== Semi-finals ===
22 January 2011	Dublin	3-13 - 0-07	Offaly	Parnell Park, Dublin

25 January 2011	Meath	0-11 - 0-08	Laois	Pairc Tailteann, Navan

=== Final ===
29 January 2011	Dublin	2-16 - 2-14 (A.E.T.)	Meath	Parnell Park, Dublin

== See also ==
- 2011 Dr McKenna Cup
