= 2017 Kildare Senior Football Championship =

Football Tournament

Kildare S.F.C.
- Season: 2017
- Champions: Moorefield (9th Title)
- Relegated: Allenwood
- Winning Captain: Daryl Flynn
- Man Of The Match: Kevin Murnaghan
- Winning Manager: Ross Glavin
- Leinster SCFC: ???
- Matches: ??

The 2017 Kildare Senior Football Championship is the 124th edition of the Kildare GAA's premier club Gaelic football tournament for senior graded teams in County Kildare, Ireland. The tournament consists of 16 teams with the winner going on to represent Kildare in the Leinster Senior Club Football Championship. The championship has a back-door format for the first two rounds before proceeding to a knock-out format. Generally, any team to lose two matches will be knocked out of the championship.

Sarsfields were the defending champions after they defeated town rivals Moorefield in the previous years final, however their Newbridge town rivals exacted their revenge when dethroning them at the quarter-final stage.

This was the Round Tower's return to the senior grade after 4 years in the middle grade.

Allenwood were relegated to the 2018 I.F.C. after losing to Eadestown in the Relegation Final, and thus ending their 27 year stay in the top-flight of Kildare club football.

== Team changes ==
The following teams have changed division since the 2016 championship season.

=== To S.F.C. ===
Promoted from 2016 Kildare Intermediate Football Championship

- Round Towers - (Intermediate Champions)

=== From S.F.C. ===
Relegated to 2017 Kildare Intermediate Football Championship

- Monasterevin

== Round 1 ==
All 16 teams enter the competition in this round. The 8 winners progress to Round 2A while the 8 losers progress to Round 2B.

6 May 2017; 14:00; Round 1	Celbridge	1-18 - 0-14	Round Towers	Hawkfield; Referee: Fergal Barry
6 May 2017; 14:00; Round 1	David Hughes 0-5 (0-1f), Shane Harte 0-4, David Byrne 1-0, John Costello 0-3, Dylan Corcoran 0-2, Fergal Conway, Padraig Carty, Paddy Brophy 0-1 each	Report	Neil Scanlon 0-8 (0-6f), Matthew Kelly 0-2 (0-1f, 1 '45), Davy O'Neill, Jason O'Brien, Stuart Murphy 0-1 each	Hawkfield; Referee: Fergal Barry

6 May 2017; 17:15; Round 1	Athy	0-13 - 1-8	Castledermot	Newbridge; Referee: Billy O'Connell
6 May 2017; 17:15; Round 1	Liam McGovern 0-6 (0-4f), David Hyland and Niall Kelly 0-2 each, Kevin Feely, Cian Reynolds, Adrian Kelly 0-1 each	Report	Gavin Keating 1-1, Willie Kelly and Dan Gray (0-1f) 0-2 each, Pauric Murphy (0-1f), David Keating, Oisin Doherty 0-1 each	Newbridge; Referee: Billy O'Connell

6 May 2017; 19:00; Round 1	Sarsfields	3-22 - 4-11	Maynooth	Newbridge; Referee: Brendan Hickey
6 May 2017; 19:00; Round 1	Ray Cahill 1-5 (0-2f), Robbie Confrey 1-2, Caoimghin McDonnell 0-4, Matty Byrne 1-0, Con Kavanagh and Cian Costigan 0-3 each, Dan Nea 0-2, Sean Dempsey (0-1f), Ronan Fitzgibbon, Darran McHugh 0-1 each	Report	Neil Flynn 1-6 (0-6f), Danny O'Sullivan and Chris Canning 1-1 each, Paddy Hever 1-0, John McAndrew 0-2, Jonathan Flattery 0-1	Newbridge; Referee: Brendan Hickey

7 May 2017; 14:00; Round 1	Naas	3-24 - 0-2	Eadestown	Hawkfield; Referee: Fintan Barrett
7 May 2017; 14:00; Round 1	Eamonn Callaghan 0-7 (0-1f), Conor Mellett 1-4 (0-3f), David Gahan (1-0 pen) and Barry Murphy 1-1, Ronan Joyce 0-3 (0-1f), Joey Cocoman and Philly Cocoman 0-2 each, Brian Byrne, John Hill, Ailin McDermott, Brian Kane 0-1 each	Report	Steven Smith (0-1f) and Cian Bolton 0-1 each	Hawkfield; Referee: Fintan Barrett

7 May 2017; 15:30; Round 1	Leixlip	2-7 - 1-8	Allenwood	Hawkfield; Referee: Liam Herbert
7 May 2017; 15:30; Round 1	Tommy Moolick 1-2, Eamon Murphy 1-1, Paddy Meagher 0-2, Niall White and Cormac O'Toole 0-1 each	Report	John Doyle 1-4 (0-1f), Johnny Byrne, Eanna O'Neill, Martin Baneham (0-1f), Killian Darling 0-1 each	Hawkfield; Referee: Liam Herbert

7 May 2017; 17:15; Round 1	Johnstownbridge	2-15 - 1-13	Carbury	Newbridge; Referee: Brendan Cawley
7 May 2017; 17:15; Round 1	Daniel Flynn 1-2, Cathal McNally 0-5, Paul Cribbin and Sean Hurley (0-3f) 0-3 each, Jimmy Farrell 1-0, Sam Doran 0-2	Report	Eoghan O'Flaherty 0-5f, Alan Kearney 1-0, Andy Dermody 0-3, Sean Costello and Terry Rossiter 0-2 each, Morgan O'Flaherty 0-1	Newbridge; Referee: Brendan Cawley

7 May 2017; 19:00; Round 1	Moorefield	0-14 - 0-14	Confey	Newbridge; Referee: Niall Colgan
7 May 2017; 19:00; Round 1	Mark Murray 0-6 (0-3f), James Murray, Eanna O'Connor, Cian O'Connor 0-2 each, Adam Tyrrell (0-1f) and Mark McDermott 0-1 each	Report	James Gately 0-6 (0-1f), Paddy Griffin, Gary Savage, Paul Divilly 0-2 each, Frankie Barry and Niall Carney 0-1 each	Newbridge; Referee: Niall Colgan

14 May 2017; 19:00; Round 1	Clane	2-11 - 1-12	St Laurence's	Newbridge; Referee: Noel McKenna
14 May 2017; 19:00; Round 1	Brian McLoughlin 0-8 (0-4f, 1 sl), Jack McCreevy 0-3 (0-2f), Conor Doyle and Kyle Devey 1-0	Report	Padraig Fogarty 0-6 (0-5f), Chris Fenner 1-2 (1-0 pen, 0-1f), Sean Fahey 0-3, Padraig O'Neill 0-1	Newbridge; Referee: Noel McKenna

10 May 2017; 19:30; Round 1 Replay	Moorefield	1-16 - 1-5	Confey	Newbridge; Referee: Billy O'Connell
10 May 2017; 19:30; Round 1 Replay		Report		Newbridge; Referee: Billy O'Connell

== Round 2 ==
=== Round 2A ===
The 8 winners from Round 1 enter this round. The 4 winners will enter the draw for the quarter-finals while the 4 losers will play in Round 3.

19 August 2017; 17:15; Round 2A	Celbridge	1-14 - 0-12	Sarsfields	Newbridge; Referee: Noel McKenna
19 August 2017; 17:15; Round 2A	David Hughes 0-5f, Paddy Brophy 1-1, Fergal Conway 0-3, Shane Harte 0-2 (0-1f), Mick O'Grady, Kevin Flynn, David Byrne 0-1 each	Report	Ray Cahill 0-5 (0-3f), Alan Smith 0-4, Dan Nea 0-2 (0-1f), Cian Costigan 0-1	Newbridge; Referee: Noel McKenna

19 August 2017; 19:00; Round 2A	Athy	5-12 - 0-10	Clane	Newbridge; Referee: Brendan Cawley
19 August 2017; 19:00; Round 2A	Niall Kelly 2-2, Kevin Feely (1-0 pen, 0-2f) and Liam McGovern (0-2f) 1-2 each, Ross Bell 1-0, Tony Martin 0-2, Darroch Mulhall, Cian Reynolds, James Eaton 0-1 each	Report	Brian McLaughlin 0-7 (0-6f), Sean Christiansen, Eoin Naughton, Jack McCreevy 0-1 each	Newbridge; Referee: Brendan Cawley

20 August 2017; 17:15; Round 2A	Johnstownbridge	0-20 - 1-10	Naas	Newbridge; Referee: Niall Colgan
20 August 2017; 17:15; Round 2A	Sean Hurley 0-5 (0-4f), Paul Cribbin, Cathal McNally and Daniel Flynn 0-3 each, Keith Cribbin (1 '45), Jimmy Farrell, Sam Doran 0-2 each	Report	Ronan Joyce 1-6 (0-5f), John Joyce 0-2, Paul McDermott and Ross Bergin 0-1 each	Newbridge; Referee: Niall Colgan

20 August 2017; 19:00; Round 2A	Moorefield	1-23 - 2-4	Leixlip	Newbridge; Referee: Declan Peppard
20 August 2017; 19:00; Round 2A	Aaron Mullins, Eanna O'Connor (1 '45), Adam Tyrrell (0-2f) 0-4 each, Ronan Sweeney 0-3, Niall Hurley-Lynch 1-0, Aaron Masterson and Eddie Heavey 0-2 each, Kevin Murnaghan, Cian O'Connor, Mark Murray, Ryan Houlihan 0-1 each	Report	Eamon Murphy 1-1, Brian Claffey 1-0, Paddy Meagher 0-2, Rob Tone 0-1	Newbridge; Referee: Declan Peppard

=== Round 2B ===
The 8 losers from Round 1 enter this round. The 4 winners will go into the Round 3 while the 4 losers will enter the Relegation Playoffs.

19 August 2017; 14:00; Round 2B	Confey	1-18 - 2-7	Eadestown	Clane; Referee: Raymond Kelly
19 August 2017; 14:00; Round 2B	Niall Carney 1-6 (0-4f), James Gately 0-4, Paddy Griffin 0-2, Conor Jennings (0-1f), Donal McClean, Gary Savage, Eoin Fitzpatrick, Conor Daly, Robbie McMahon 0-1 each	Report	Cian Bolton 1-2, Johnny Deane 1-0, Emmet Bolton and Steven Smith (0-1f) 0-2 each, Barry Lawlor 0-1	Clane; Referee: Raymond Kelly

19 August 2017; 15:30; Round 2B	Carbury	0-25 - 2-13	Maynooth	Clane; Referee: Conor Daly
19 August 2017; 15:30; Round 2B	Eoghan O'Flaherty 0-8 (0-2f), Morgan O'Flaherty and Dale Redmond 0-3 each, Andy Dermody, Terry Rossiter, Stephen McGlynn, Shane Cummins 0-2 each, Brian O'Flaherty, Alan Kearney, James Kelly 0-1 each	Report	Neil Flynn 0-7 (0-3f, 1 '45), Sean Sinclair 1-1, John McAndrew 1-0, Ruadhan O'Giollain 0-2, P Murphy, Jonathan Flattery, Chris Canning 0-1	Clane; Referee: Conor Daly

20 August 2017; 12:00; Round 2B	Round Towers	1-16 - 1-9	St Laurence's	Newbridge; Referee: Liam Herbert
20 August 2017; 12:00; Round 2B	Conor Hyland 1-2, Neil Scanlon 0-5 (0-3f), Cathal Daffy and Jason O'Brien 0-2 each, Mark Waters, Mark Byrne, Evan Flynn, Stuart Murphy, Matthew Kelly 0-1 each	Report	Padraig Fogarty 1-6 (0-4f), Stephen Mann, Jason McHugh, Eoin O'Neill 0-1	Newbridge; Referee: Liam Herbert

20 August 2017; 15:00; Round 2B	Castledermot	1-10 - 1-10	Allenwood	Hawkfield; Referee: Fergal Barry
20 August 2017; 15:00; Round 2B	Gavin Keating 0-5 (0-3f), Aaron Murphy 1-1, Bryan Nolan, Emmet O'Keefe, Johnny Mahon, Fionn O'Gorman 0-1 each		John Doyle 0-4f, Ernie Price 1-0, Darragh Malone and Martin Baneham 0-2 each, Johnny Byrne and Aaron Dunne 0-1 each	Hawkfield; Referee: Fergal Barry

24 August 2017; 19:30; Round 2B Replay	Castledermot	0-14 - 0-10	Allenwood	Hawkfield; Referee: Fintan Barrett
24 August 2017; 19:30; Round 2B Replay	Gavin Keating 0-4 (0-3f), Emmet O'Keefe 0-3, David Keating 0-2, Pauric Murphy (0-1f), Paddy Whelan, Aaron Murphy, Fionn O'Gorman, Dan Gray 0-1 each	Report	Johnny Byrne 0-4, John Doyle 0-3 (0-2f), Darragh Malone 0-2, Eric Judge 0-1f	Hawkfield; Referee: Fintan Barrett

== Round 3 ==
The 4 losers from Round 2A enter this round and they play the 4 winners from Round 2B. The 4 winners will go into the draw for the quarter-finals.

2 September 2017; 2:00pm Round 3	Clane	1-15 - 0-13	Leixlip	Newbridge; Referee: Kieran Harris
2 September 2017; 2:00pm Round 3		Report		Newbridge; Referee: Kieran Harris

2 September 2017; 3:45pm Round 3	Sarsfields	2-13 - 3-5	Castledermot	Newbridge; Referee: Owen Murphy
2 September 2017; 3:45pm Round 3		Report		Newbridge; Referee: Owen Murphy

2 September 2017; 5:30pm Round 3	Naas	2-13 - 0-12	Carbury	Hawkfield; Referee: Noel McKenna
2 September 2017; 5:30pm Round 3		Report		Hawkfield; Referee: Noel McKenna

2 September 2017; 7:00pm Round 3	Round Towers	2-7 - 1-10	Confey	Hawkfield; Referee: Brendan Cawley
2 September 2017; 7:00pm Round 3		Report		Hawkfield; Referee: Brendan Cawley

6 September 2017; 8:00pm Round 3 Replay	Round Towers	3-14 - 1-11	Confey	Hawkfield; Referee: Noel McKenna

Quarter-Finals	Semi-Finals	Final
???
???	???
???	???
???		???
???		???
???	???
???	???
???

== Quarter-finals ==
16 September 2017; 1:45 pm Quarter-Final	Johnstownbridge	3-17 - 0-8	Clane	Newbridge; Referee: Brendan Hickey
16 September 2017; 1:45 pm Quarter-Final	Paul Cribbin and Daniel Flynn 1-3 each, Sean Hurley 0-4f, Seamus McNally 1-0, Cathal McNally 0-3, Luke Flynn, Glen Doran, Jimmy Farrell, Sam Doran 0-1 each	Report	Brian McLoughlin 0-6f, Jake Devey and Eoin O’Neill (1 '45) 0-1 each	Newbridge; Referee: Brendan Hickey

16 September 2017; 3:30 pm Quarter-Final	Moorefield	2-11 - 1-11	Sarsfields	Newbridge; Referee: Noel McKenna
16 September 2017; 3:30 pm Quarter-Final	Eanna O'Connor 1-2 (0-2f), Niall Hurley-Lynch 1-1, Adam Tyrrell 0-3 (0-2f), Eddie Heavey 0-2, Cian O'Connor, Mark Murray (0-1f), Ryan Houlihan 0-1 each	Report	Ray Cahill 1-9 (0-9f), Ben McCormack and Dan Nea (0-1f) 0-1 each	Newbridge; Referee: Noel McKenna

16 September 2017; 5:30 pm Quarter-Final	Athy	0-21 - 0-6	Round Towers	Hawkfield; Referee: Billy O'Connell
16 September 2017; 5:30 pm Quarter-Final	Liam McGovern 0-8 (0-6f), Darroch Mulhall 0-4, Niall Kelly 0-3, Kevin Feely 0-2, David Hyland, Pascal Connell, Hugh Mahon, James Eaton 0-1 each	Report	Neil Scanlon 0-3f, Mark Scanlon, Evan Flynn, Matthew Kelly 0-1 each	Hawkfield; Referee: Billy O'Connell

16 September 2017; 7:00 pm Quarter-Final	Celbridge	1-14 - 0-11	Naas	Newbridge; Referee: Raymond Kelly
16 September 2017; 7:00 pm Quarter-Final	David Hughes 1-1 (0-1f), Paddy Brophy 0-4, Shane Harte 0-3, Fergal Conway and Tony Archbold 0-2 each, Mick O'Grady and John Costello 0-1 each	Report	Ronan Joyce 0-7 (0-6f), Shane Bergin (1 '45), Paul McDermott, John Joyce, Eamonn Callaghan 0-1 each	Newbridge; Referee: Raymond Kelly

== Semi-finals ==
30 September 2017; 3:00 pm Semi-final	Celbridge	0-14 - 1-8	Johnstownbridge	Newbridge; Referee: Raymond Kelly; Man of the Match: Paddy Brophy
30 September 2017; 3:00 pm Semi-final	David Hughes 0-4 (0-2f, 1 '45), Paddy Brophy 0-3, Tony Archbold and Mark O'Sullivan 0-2 each, Kevin Flynn, Shane Harte, David Byrne 0-1 each	Report	Paul Cribbin 0-4, Luke Flynn 1-0 pen, Cathal McNally 0-2, Sean Hurley (0-1f) and Jimmy Farrell 0-1 each	Newbridge; Referee: Raymond Kelly; Man of the Match: Paddy Brophy

30 September 2017; 4:45 pm Semi-final	Moorefield	3-13 - 0-14	Athy	Newbridge; Referee: Liam Herbert; Man of the Match: Niall Hurley-Lynch
30 September 2017; 4:45 pm Semi-final	Niall Hurley-Lynch 2-1, Adam Tyrrell (0-2f) and Eanna O'Connor (0-1f) 0-5 each, Eddie Heavey 1-0, Ronan Sweeney 0-2	Report	Liam McGovern 0-7 (0-3f), Pascal Connell, Darroch Mulhall, Tony Gibbons 0-2 each, Kevin Feely 0-1f	Newbridge; Referee: Liam Herbert; Man of the Match: Niall Hurley-Lynch

== Final ==
15 October 2017; 3:30 pm Final	Moorefield	0-11 - 0-9	Celbridge	St. Conleth's Park; Referee: Noel McKenna (Ballyteague); Man of the Match: Kevin Murnaghan
15 October 2017; 3:30 pm Final	Adam Tyrrell (0-4f) and Eanna O'Connor (0-3f, 1 '45) 0-4 each, Eddie Heavey 0-2, Kevin Murnaghan 0-1	Report	David Hughes (0-2f) and Shane Harte (0-2f) 0-3 each, Kevin Flynn, Paddy Brophy, Dylan Corcoran 0-1 each	St. Conleth's Park; Referee: Noel McKenna (Ballyteague); Man of the Match: Kevin Murnaghan

== Relegation playoff ==
=== Relegation Semi-Finals ===
- St. Laurence's 2-13, 1-9 Allenwood, Hawkfield, 14/9/2017,
- Maynooth 1-8, 0-9 Eadestown, Hawkfield, 14/9/2017,

=== Relegation Final ===
- Eadestown 3-12, 1-13 Allenwood, Hawkfield, 24/9/2017,
