= 2018 Kildare Senior Football Championship =

Kildare S.F.C.
- Season: 2018
- Champions: Moorefield
- Relegated: Leixlip
- Winning Captain: ???
- Man Of The Match: ???
- Winning Manager: ???
- Leinster SCFC: ???
- Matches: ??

The 2018 Kildare Senior Football Championship is the 125th edition of the Kildare GAA's premier club Gaelic football tournament for senior graded teams in County Kildare, Ireland. The tournament consists of 16 teams with the winner going on to represent Kildare in the Leinster Senior Club Football Championship. The championship had a different format this year, employing a random draw for the first round, followed by seeded groups and a knock-out stage.

Moorefield were the defending champions after they defeated Celbridge in the previous years final.

This was Raheens' return to the senior grade after 12 years outside the top-flight of Kildare club football.

== Team changes ==
The following teams have changed division since the 2017 championship season.

=== To S.F.C. ===
Promoted from 2017 Kildare I.F.C.

- Raheens - (Intermediate Champions)

=== From S.F.C. ===
Relegated to 2018 Kildare I.F.C.

- Allenwood

== Format ==
The 2018 Senior and Intermediate County Championship used a completely new format this year. 16 teams play in eight first round games after which all 16 teams will go into four groups of four with two winners and two losers from the opening round in each of those groups. After which the teams that finish first and second will qualify for the knockout stages while the four bottom clubs have to fend off relegation in a Relegation Semi-Final.

== First round ==
- Johnstownbridge 1-14, 0-11 Confey, St. Conleth's Park, 4/5/2018,
- Celbridge 2-18, 1-12 Castledermot, Hawkfield, 5/5/2018,
- Athy 0-23, 2-12 Maynooth, Hawkfield, 5/5/2018,
- St. Laurence's 2-15, 1-10 Clane, St. Conleth's Park, 5/5/2018,
- Naas 0-25, 0-10 Round Towers, St. Conleth's Park, 5/5/2018,
- Leixlip 1-10, 1-10 Eadestown, St. Conleth's Park, 6/5/2018,
- Moorefield 0-22, 4-8 Carbury, St. Conleth's Park, 6/5/2018,
- Leixlip 2-20, 3-5 Eadestown, Hawkfield, 9/5/2018, (Replay)

== Group stage ==
All 16 teams play in the group stage. There are four groups of four, with each group consisting of 2 First Round winners and losers. The top team in each group go into the Quarter-Finals, 2nd and 3rd in each group proceed to the Preliminary Quarter-Finals while the bottom team of each group entered a Relegation Playoff.

=== Group A ===
Team	Pld	W	D	L	PF	PA	PD	Pts
St. Laurence's	3	2	0	1	56	43	+13	4
Naas	3	2	0	1	57	53	+4	4
Maynooth	3	1	0	2	45	60	−15	2
Castledermot	3	1	0	2	50	53	−3	2

Round 1

- St. Laurence's 1-16, 0-7 Maynooth, 17/8/2018,
- Naas 1-14, 0-14 Castledermot, 18/8/2018,

Round 2

- Castledermot 2-16, 2-11 St. Laurence's, 24/8/2018,
- Naas 1-24, 2-13 Maynooth, 1/9/2018,

Round 3

- St. Laurence's 3-11, 0-13 Naas, 9/9/2018,
- Maynooth 4-7, 0-14 Castledermot, 9/9/2018,

=== Group B ===
Team	Pld	W	D	L	PF	PA	PD	Pts
Athy	3	3	0	0	52	33	+19	6
Carbury	4	2	0	2	64	51	+13	4
Round Towers	3	1	0	2	48	50	−2	2
Leixlip	3	0	0	3	34	64	−30	0

Round 1

- Round Towers 3-13, 3-7 Leixlip, 17/8/2018,
- Athy 1-22, 0-15 Carbury, 18/8/2018,

Round 2

- Athy 0-14, 1-9 Round Towers, 25/8/2018,
- Carbury 5-14, 1-9 Leixlip, 1/9/2018,

Round 3

- Athy 0-13, 0-6 Leixlip, 8/9/2018,
- Carbury 2-14, 1-11 Round Towers, 8/9/2018,

=== Group C ===
Team	Pld	W	D	L	PF	PA	PD	Pts
Moorefield	3	3	0	0	73	36	+37	6
Johnstownbridge	3	2	0	1	62	43	+19	4
Raheens	3	0	1	2	54	66	−12	1
Clane	3	0	1	2	42	84	−42	1

Round 1

- Moorefield 3-16, 2-11 Raheens, 18/8/2018,
- Johnstownbridge 6-13, 0-13 Clane, 18/8/2018,

Round 2

- Johnstownbridge 1-17, 1-13 Raheens, 1/9/2018,
- Moorefield 3-23, 0-8 Clane, 1/9/2018,

Round 3

- Clane 4-9, 4-9 Raheens, 9/9/2018,
- Moorefield 0-14, 2-5 Johnstownbridge, 9/9/2018,

=== Group D ===
Team	Pld	W	D	L	PF	PA	PD	Pts
Celbridge	3	3	0	0	70	25	+45	6
Sarsfields	3	2	0	1	64	30	+34	4
Confey	3	1	0	2	28	59	−31	2
Eadestown	3	0	0	3	29	77	−48	0

Round 1

- Celbridge 4-21, 0-7 Eadestown, 18/8/2018,
- Sarsfields 2-18, 0-6 Confey, 18/8/2018,

Round 2

- Sarsfields 4-19, 1-8 Eadestown, 25/8/2018,
- Celbridge 1-21, 1-6 Confey, 1/9/2018,

Round 3

- Celbridge 0-13, 0-9 Sarsfields, 8/9/2018,
- Confey 0-13, 1-8 Eadestown, 8/9/2018,

== Knock-out stage ==
=== Preliminary quarter-finals ===
15 September 2018	Naas	5-19 - 3-7	Raheens	Newbridge; Referee: ??? Man of the Match: ???

16 September 2018	Carbury	2-18 - 0-20	Confey	Newbridge; Referee: ??? Man of the Match: ???

16 September 2018	Sarsfields	1-11 - 2-4	Maynooth	Newbridge; Referee: ??? Man of the Match: ???

16 September 2018	Johnstownbridge	2-13 - 1-12	Round Towers	Newbridge; Referee: ??? Man of the Match: ???

=== Quarter-finals ===
23 September 2018; 3:45pm	Moorefield	1-17 - 1-9	Johnstownbridge	Newbridge; Referee: ??? Man of the Match: ???

23 September 2018; 5:30pm	Athy	2-11 - 0-7	Sarsfields	Newbridge; Referee: ??? Man of the Match: ???

29 September 2018	Naas	1-13 - 2-7	St. Laurence's	Newbridge; Referee: ??? Man of the Match: ???

29 September 2018	Celbridge	1-15 - 0-10	Carbury	Newbridge; Referee: ??? Man of the Match: ???

=== Semi-finals ===
6 October 2018	Athy	0-17 - 1-13	Celbridge	Newbridge; Referee: ??? Man of the Match: ???

7 October 2018	Moorefield	0-17 - 0-9	Naas	Newbridge; Referee: ??? Man of the Match: ???

=== Final ===
21 October 2018	Moorefield	2-12 - 2-9	Athy	Newbridge; Referee: ??? Man of the Match: ???

== Relegation playoff ==
=== Relegation semi-finals ===
- Eadestown 1-11, 0-10 Leixlip, Hawkfield, 22/9/2018,
- Castledermot 0-17, 0-11 Clane, Hawkfield, 22/9/2018,

=== Relegation final ===
- Clane 0-13, 0-12 Leixlip, Hawkfield, 6/10/2019,
