= 2020 Kildare Senior Football Championship =

Kildare S.F.C.
- Season: 2020
- Champions: Athy (7th S.F.C. Title)
- Relegated: Monasterevan
- Winning Captain: David Hyland
- Man Of The Match: Mick Foley
- Winning Manager: Vinnie Walsh
- Leinster SCFC: None

The 2020 Kildare Senior Football Championship was the 127th edition of the Kildare GAA's premier club Gaelic football tournament for senior graded teams in County Kildare, Ireland. The tournament consists of 16 teams with the winner not going on to represent Kildare in the Leinster Senior Club Football Championship, due to the latter competition's cancellation. Due to the emergence of and the impact of the COVID-19 pandemic on Gaelic games, the championship had a different format this year, beginning with a group-stage followed by a knock-out stage. Championship activity was postponed temporarily between Friday 7th and Sunday 23 August, when Co. Kildare was placed into lockdown alongside Laois and Offaly.

Sarsfields were the defending champions this year after they defeated Moorefield in the previous years final.

This was Monasterevan's return to the senior grade after a three year exodus when claiming the 2019 Kildare I.F.C. (they were relegated from senior back in 2016).

On 3 October 2020, Athy won their 7th Kildare Senior Football title and first since 2011 after beating Moorefield 1-11 to 0-12 in the final.

== Team changes ==
The following teams have changed division since the 2019 championship season.

=== To S.F.C. ===
Promoted from 2019 I.F.C.

- Monasterevan - (Intermediate Champions)

=== From S.F.C. ===
Relegated to 2020 I.F.C.

- Two Mile House

== Group stage ==
All 16 teams play in the group stage, drawn into four groups of four. The top two teams in each group qualify into the quarter-finals, while the bottom team in each group enter the Relegation Playoffs.

=== Group A ===
Team	Pld	W	L	D	PF	PA	PD	Pts
Athy	3	3	0	0	58	40	+18	6
Clane	3	2	1	0	56	32	+24	4
Castledermot	3	1	2	0	50	48	+2	2
Monasterevan	3	0	3	0	20	68	-44	0

Round 1:

- Clane 3-17, 0-2 Monasterevan, 2/8/2020,
- Athy 3-14, 1-10 Castledermot, 3/8/2020,

Round 2:

- Athy 0-18, 0-17 Clane, 8/9/2020,
- Castledermot 2-19, 0-12 Monasterevan, 5/9/2020,

Round 3:

- Athy 1-14, 0-10 Monasterevan, 13/9/2020,
- Clane 0-13, 0-12 Castledermot, 13/9/2020,

=== Group B ===
Team	Pld	W	L	D	PF	PA	PD	Pts
Moorefield	3	2	1	0	57	36	+21	4
Raheens	3	2	1	0	47	37	+10	4
Carbury	3	2	1	0	43	57	-14	4
Maynooth	0	0	3	0	37	54	-17	0

Round 1:

- Raheens 3-9, 0-8 Maynooth, 31/7/2020,
- Moorefield 2-20, 1-6 Carbury, 1/8/2020,

Round 2:

- Raheens 1-11, 1-12 Carbury, 6/9/2020,
- Moorefield 1-14, 1-9 Maynooth, 5/9/2020,

Round 3:

- Carbury 2-13, 2-11 Maynooth, 12/9/2020,
- Moorefield 0-14, 2-9 Raheens, 12/9/2020,

=== Group C ===
Team	Pld	W	L	D	PF	PA	PD	Pts
Sarsfields	3	3	0	0	69	35	+34	6
Johnstownbridge	3	2	1	0	69	53	+16	4
St. Laurence's	3	1	2	0	46	63	-17	2
Eadestown	3	0	3	0	35	68	-33	0

Round 1:

- St. Laurence's 0-14, 0-12 Eadestown, 2/8/2020,
- Sarsfields 2-17, 0-10 Johnstownbridge, 2/8/2020,

Round 2:

- Sarsfields 4-15, 1-6 Eadestown, 6/9/2020,
- Johnstownbridge 5-17, 1-13 St. Laurence's, 5/9/2020,

Round 3:

- Johnstownbridge 4-15, 3-5 Eadestown, 12/9/2020,
- Sarsfields 3-10, 1-13 St. Laurence's, 12/9/2020,

=== Group D ===
Team	Pld	W	L	D	PF	PA	PD	Pts
Celbridge	3	3	0	0	64	36	+28	6
Round Towers	3	2	1	0	44	36	+8	4
Naas	3	1	2	0	48	44	+4	2
Confey	3	0	3	0	36	76	-40	0

Round 1:

- Celbridge 4-20, 2-7 Confey, 1/8/2020,
- Round Towers 1-11, 0-11 Naas, 1/8/2020,

Round 2:

- Naas 2-16, 0-14 Confey, 8/9/2020,
- Celbridge 1-13, 1-5 Round Towers, 6/9/2020,

Round 3:

- Round Towers 3-13, 1-6 Confey, 6/9/2020,
- Celbridge 2-10, 0-15 Naas, 6/9/2020,

== Relegation play-offs ==
=== Relegation Semi-Finals ===
The four teams who finished bottom of their respective groups entered the Relegation Semi-Finals. The two winners from these Semi-Finals will secure their Senor status for 2021, while the two losers will proceed to the Relegation Final.

- Maynooth 2-16, 0-22 Eadestown, 19/9/2020, AET (Eadestown win 7-6 on penalties)
- Monasterevan 0-6, 2-11 Confey, 25/9/2020,

=== Relegation Final ===
The loser of the Relegation final will be relegated to the 2021 Kildare I.F.C. The winner will maintain their Senior status into 2021.

- Maynooth 2-11, 1-10 Monasterevan, 02/10/2020,

== Finals ==
=== Quarter-finals ===
19 September 2020; 15:00	Moorefield	1-18 - 2-9	Johnstownbridge	Newbridge

19 September 2020; 17:00	Sarsfields	2-14 - 2-6	Raheens	Newbridge

20 September 2020; 15:00	Celbridge	1-18 - 0-7	Clane	Newbridge

20 September 2020; 17:00	Athy	0-19 - 1-6	Round Towers	Newbridge

=== Semi-finals ===
26 September 2020; 14:00	Moorefield	0-14 - 1-9	Celbridge	Newbridge

26 September 2020; 16:30	Athy	1-10 - 0-10	Sarsfields	Newbridge

=== Final ===
4 October 2020; 16:30 IST (UTC+1); Final	Moorefield	0-12 - 1-11	Athy	Newbridge; Referee: Niall Colgan; Man of the Match: Mick Foley
4 October 2020; 16:30 IST (UTC+1); Final		https://hoganstand.com/Kildare/Article/Index/313242		Newbridge; Referee: Niall Colgan; Man of the Match: Mick Foley
