= 1935 All-Ireland Senior Football Championship =

Football championship

All-Ireland Champions
- Winning team: Cavan (2nd win)
- Captain: Hughie O'Reilly

All-Ireland Finalists
- Losing team: Kildare
- Captain: Jack Higgins

Provincial Champions
- Munster: Tipperary
- Leinster: Kildare
- Ulster: Cavan
- Connacht: Mayo

Championship statistics

The 1935 All-Ireland Senior Football Championship was the 49th staging of Ireland's premier Gaelic football knock-out competition. Galway entered the championship as defending champions; however, they were beaten by Mayo in the Connacht final. Cavan won their second title in three years.

== Results ==
=== Connacht Senior Football Championship ===
12 May 1935
Quarter-Final

Sligo	3–10 – 3–3	Roscommon

Tubbercurry

26 May 1935
Semi-Final

Mayo	9–2 – 3–3	Leitrim

Sligo

2 June 1935
Semi-Final

Galway	5–4 – 0–2	Sligo

McHale Park, Castlebar
Attendance: 4,000

==== Final ====
21 July 1935
Final

Mayo	0–12 – 0–5	Galway
G Courell (0–7, six frees), P Moclair (0–1), P Munnelly (0–3).

Roscommon
Attendance: 26,000

=== Leinster Senior Football Championship ===
5 May 1935
Preliminary Round

Westmeath	3–7 – 2–2	Offaly

Cusack Park, Mullingar
Referee: JV Kelly (Longford)

5 May 1935
Preliminary Round

Carlow	5–7 – 1–6	Wexford

Muineberg

12 May 1935
Quarter-Final

Carlow	3–6 – 4–3	Westmeath

Croke Park, Dublin

2 June 1935
Quarter-Final Replay

Carlow	2–2 – 3–6	Westmeath

O'Moore Park, Portlaoise

June 1935
Quarter-Final

Louth	0–6 – 0–3	Dublin

Navan

23 June 1935
Quarter-Final

Meath	2–7 – 0–8	Westmeath

Kells

7 July 1935
Semi-Final

Kildare	1–9 – 0–3	Laois
M.Geraghty 0–4, J.Dowling 1–0, T.Keogh, P.Byrne 0–2, P.Martin 0–1.

O'Connor Park, Tullamore

14 July 1935
Semi-Final

Meath	1–4 – 1–5	Louth

Croke Park, Dublin

==== Final ====
28 July 1935
Final

Kildare	0-08–0-06	Louth
Paddy Byrne (0-3f), Paddy Martin (0-2), Tom Mulhall (0-1), Mick Geraghty (0-1), Tom Keogh (0-1)		Tom Caffrey (0-2f), Paddy Moore (0–2), Paddy Cluskey (0-1f), Jimmy Coyle (0–1)

Croke Park, Dublin
Attendance: 20,000
Referee: Martin Lynch (Carlow)

GK	1	Paddy Chanders (Athy)
RCB	2	William Mangan (Garda, Dublin)
FB	3	Matt Goff (Army Metro, Dublin)
LCB	4	James Byrne (Army Metro, Dublin)
RHB	5	Peter Waters (Raheens)
CHB	6	Jack Higgins (Naas)
LHB	7	Frank Dowling (Robertstown)
MF	8	Paul Matthews (Athy) (c)
MF	9	Christopher Higgins (Naas)
RHF	10	Tommy Mulhall (Athy)
CHF	11	Patrick Martin (Castledermot)
LHF	12	Patrick Byrne (Castledermot)
RCF	13	Patrick Geraghty (Roseberry)
FF	14	Mick Geraghty (Roseberry)
LCF	15	Thomas Keogh (Garda, Dublin)

GK	1	Hugh Callan (Dundalk Gaels)
RCB	2	Paddy McManus (Wolfe Tones)
FB	3	Eddie Boyle (Cooley Kickhams)
LCB	4	Jim Culligan (Newtown Blues)
RHB	5	Jimmy Kelly (Glyde Rangers)
CHB	6	Eugene Callan (Dundalk Young Irelands)
LHB	7	Paddy Cluskey (Darver Young Irelands)
MF	8	Jim Curran (Erin's Hope, Dublin)
MF	9	Jimmy Coyle (Seán McDermott's, Dublin) (c)
RHF	10	Seán Taaffe (Glyde Rangers)
CHF	11	Tom Caffrey (Newtown Blues)
LHF	12	Patrick Cluskey (St Magdalene's)
RCF	13	Seán McShane
FF	14	Paddy Moore (St Magdalene's)
LCF	15	Pete Martin (Army Metro, Dublin)
Substitutes:
	16	James McKevitt (Cooley Kickhams) for Kelly

=== Munster Senior Football Championship ===
Boycott of 1935 which leads to GAA's collapse in Kerry for over a year and severely damages credibility of IRA in Kerry caused them not to play in the 1935 Munster football championship.

12 May 1935
Quarter-Final

Tipperary	W – L	Kerry

12 May 1935
Quarter-Final

Clare	2–4 – 0–6	Waterford

Fraher Field, Dungarvan

26 May 1935
Semi-Final

Cork	2–3 – 0–4	Limerick
W. Lynch (1–0) & T. Cotter (1–1).

Dr. Mannix Sportsfield, Charleville

30 June 1935
Semi-Final

Tipperary	1–8 – 0–8	Clare

Ennis
Referee: W. Hough (L)

==== Final ====
21 July 1935
Final

Tipperary	2–8 – 1–2	Cork
		F. Healy & S. Sheehan (0–1) & T. Cotter (1–1).

Páirc Mac Gearailt, Fermoy
Referee: D. Ryan (Kerry)

=== Ulster Senior Football Championship ===
9 June 1935
Quarter-Final

Armagh	2–5 – 0–5	Down

Athletic Grounds, Armagh

9 June 1935
Quarter-Final

Cavan	1–11 – 1–09	Donegal

Bundoran

16 June 1935
Quarter-Final

Fermanagh	0–5 – 1–2	Tyrone

Omagh

16 June 1935
Quarter-Final

Monaghan	3–8 – 2–2	Antrim

St. Mary's Park, Castleblayney

30 June 1935
Quarter-Final Replay

Fermanagh	1–11 – 2–6	Tyrone

St. Molaise Park, Irvinestown

30 June 1935
Semi-Final

Cavan	2–12 – 0–1	Monaghan

Breffni Park, Cavan
Attendance: 5,000

8 July 1935
Semi-Final

Fermanagh	0–9 – 1–6	Armagh

Brewster Park, Enniskillen

14 July 1935
Semi-Final Replay

Fermanagh	3–4 – 2–2	Armagh

Athletic Grounds, Armagh

==== Final ====
28 July 1935
Final

Cavan	2–6 – 2–1	Fermanagh

Belturbet

=== All-Ireland Senior Football Championship ===
18 August 1935
Semi-Final

Cavan	1–7 – 0–8	Tipperary

Croke Park, Dublin
Referee: P. McDonnell

25 August 1935
Semi-Final

Kildare	2–6 – 0–7	Mayo
M.Geraghty 1–2, T.Keogh 1–0, J.Dowling 0–2, P.Byrne, P.Waters 0–1.		P Flannelly (0–2), G Courell (0–3, two frees), P Moclair (0–1), P Munnelly (0–1).

Croke Park, Dublin

==== Final ====
22 September 1935
Final

Cavan	3–6 – 2–5	Kildare
P. Boylan 2-0, T. O'Reilly 1-0, M.J. Magee 0-3, P. Delvin, H. O'Reilly & J. Smallhouse 0-1.		M. Geraghty 1–1, T. Mulhall 1–0, P. Martin 0–2, P. Matthews, J. Dowling 0–1.

Croke Park, Dublin
Attendance: 50,380
Referee: Stephen Jordan (Galway)

== Championship statistics ==
=== Miscellaneous ===
- Kerry withdrew from championship due to Boycotts with the IRA awarded their Munster Quarter Final to Tipperary.
- Navan GAA Grounds become Páirc Tailteann.
- Tipperary end a 13 year for the Munster title winning their first since 1922, their only title between then and 2020.
