= Kildare Intermediate Football Championship =

Annual Gaelic football competition

The Kildare Intermediate Football Championship, or Kildare I.F.C., is an annual Gaelic football competition contested by mid-tier Kildare GAA clubs since 1928. The winners currently receive the Hugh Campion Cup in honour of the Suncroft official who served as County Board Chairman from 1972 to 1981.

== Qualification for subsequent competitions ==
=== Leinster Intermediate Club Football Championship ===
The Kildare IFC winner qualifies for the Leinster Intermediate Club Football Championship. It is the only team from County Kildare to qualify for this competition. The Kildare IFC winner may enter the Leinster Intermediate Club Football Championship at either the preliminary round or the quarter-final stage. For example, 2018 winner Two Mile House won the Leinster final, as did 2016 winner St Colmcille's, also at GAA headquarters. as did 2012 winner Monasterevin, 2006 winner Confey, while the Kildare IFC winning club won consecutive Leinster IHC titles in 2009 and 2010, won respectively by Maynooth and Ballymore Eustace...

=== All-Ireland Intermediate Club Football Championship ===
The Kildare IFC winner — by winning the Leinster Intermediate Club Football Championship — may qualify for the All-Ireland Intermediate Club Football Championship, at which it would enter at the semi-final stage, providing it hasn't been drawn to face the British champions in the quarter-finals.

== Awards ==
The captain of the winning team is presented with the Hugh Campion Cup in honour of the Suncroft official who served as County Board Chairman from 1972 to 1981.

A 'Team of the Week' is also selected during the competition's run.

== Winners by team ==
#	Team	Wins	Years won
1	Maynooth	7	1936, 1948, 1957, 1965, 1999, 2005, 2009
2	Castledermot	5	1928, 1932, 1963, 1985, 2015
2	Kilcullen	5	1945, 1956, 1961, 1976, 1998
4	Ballymore	4	1952, 1986, 1994, 2010
4	Kilcock	4	1938, 1969, 1982, 2021
4	Eadestown	4	1968, 1983, 1996, 2014
4	Ellistown	4	1935, 1951, 1964, 2000
4	Monasterevan	4	1959, 1971, 2012, 2019
4	Rathangan	4	1941, 1981, 1993, 2001
4	Suncroft	4	1944, 1950, 1989, 2007
4	Sallins	4	1967, 1977, 2003, 2025
12	Allenwood	3	1962, 1990, 2023
12	Ballykelly	3	1955, 1960, 1975
12	Ballyteague	3	1973, 1991, 2022
12	Rheban	3	1942, 1970, 1997
12	Caragh	3	1931, 1995, 2024
17	Castlemitchell	5	1953, 1992, 2028, 1969, 2001
17	Celbridge	2	1987, 2002
17	Clane	2	1940, 1949
17	Confey	2	2006, 2011
17	Johnstownbridge	2	1978, 2013
17	Leixlip	2	1929, 1934
17	Milltown	2	1947, 1972
17	Moorefield	2	1937, 1939
17	Naas	2	1984, 2004
17	St Kevin's	2	1979, 2008
17	Raheens	2	1958, 2017
17	Round Towers	2	1988, 2016
29	Athy	1	1974
29	Ardclough	1	1943
29	Cappagh	1	1946
29	Carbury	1	1930
29	Clogherinkoe	1	2020
29	Newbridge	1	1933
29	St Laurence's	1	1980
29	Straffan	1	1966
29	Two Mile House	1	2018
29	Young Emmmets	1	1954

== Finals listed by year ==
2025	Sallins	1-19	St Laurance's	0-12
2024	Caragh	1-05	Leixlip	0-06
2023	Allenwood	0-11	Castledermot	1-7
2022	Ballyteague	2-13	Castledermot	1-12
2021	Kilcock	1-16	Ballymore Eustace	0-07
2020	Clogherinkoe	0-14	Kilcock	0-13
2019	Monasterevin	1-08	Leixlip	0-07
2018	Two Mile House	0-16	Monasterevin	1-08
2017	Raheens	2-12	Kilcock	1-09
2016	Round Towers	2-11	Two Mile House	1-13
2015	Castledermot	1-12	Raheens	0-12
2014	Eadestown	1-10	Round Towers	0-11
2013	Johnstownbridge	2-14	Castledermot	1-10
2012	Monasterevin	1-10	Raheens	0-07
2011	Confey	1-05	Ellistown	0-04
2010	Ballymore Eustace	1-11	Confey	0-12
2009	Maynooth	3-14	Kilcullen	0-13
2008	St. Kevin's	1-08, 2-09 (R)	Monasterevin	1-08, 0-06 (R)
2007	Suncroft	1-08	Ballymore Eustace	0-07
2006	Confey	0-14	St. Kevin's	1-09
2005	Maynooth	1-11	St. Kevin's	0-04
2004	Naas	2-06	Confey	0-06
2003	Sallins	0-13	Suncroft	0-10
2002	Celbridge	0-09	Eadestown	0-06
2001	Rathangan	1-14	Eadestown	1-11
2000	Ellistown	2-05	Ballyteague	0-10
1999	Maynooth	0-11	St. Kevin's	1-06
1998	Kilcullen	2-11	St. Kevin's	0-10
1997	Rheban	2-14	Castledermot	1-06
1996	Eadestown	0-09 (R) 1-09	St. Kevin's	1-05 (R) 2-06
1995	Caragh	1-11	St. Kevin's	1-04
1994	Ballymore Eustace	2-10	Castledermot	2-09
1993	Rathangan	0-09 (R) 3-05	Eadestown	0-08 (R) 0-14
1992	Castlemitchell	1-08	Grangenolvin	0-08
1991	Ballyteague	1-12	Castlemitchell	2-04
1990	Allenwood	1-9	Clogherinkoe	0-08
1989	Suncroft	2-09	Clogherinkoe	0-09
1988	Round Towers	2-06	Suncroft	0-06
1987	Celbridge	1-08	Clogherinkoe	0-08
1986	Ballymore Eustace	2-13	Suncroft	2-05
1985	Castledermot	1-09	Suncroft	0-09
1984	Naas	2-06	Suncroft	1-07
1983	Eadestown	3-11	Castledermot	1-09
1982	Kilcock	1-13	Ellistown	0-05
1981	Rathangan	2-11	Castledermot	0-10
1980	St. Laurence's	4-07	Castledermot	2-05
1979	St. Kevin's	1-12	St. Laurence's	1-05
1978	Johnstownbridge	1-09	St. Kevin's	1-06
1977	Sallins	0-12	Milltown	2-02
1976	Kilcullen	3-11	Rathangan	3-05
1975	Ballykelly	0-09 3-06 (R)	Rathangan	1-06 2-08 (R)
1974	Athy	3-09	Sallins	1-08
1973	Ballyteague	1-12	Rathangan	0-05
1972	Milltown	2-08	Rathangan	2-06
1971	Monasterevin	2-09	Grangenolvin	1-05
1970	Rheban	1-14	Athy	1-07
1969	Kilcock	1-05	Athy	0-07
1968	Eadestown	4-10	Johnstownbridge	2-05
1967	Sallins	0-07	Castlemitchel	0-06
1966	Straffan	5-08	Ballykelly	0-08
1965	Maynooth	2-08	Castlemitchel	1-02
1964	Ellistown	2-10	Maynooth	2-07
1963	Castledermot	0-09	Suncroft	0-07
1962	Allenwood	3-12	Celbridge	1-00
1961	Kilcullen	2-03	Rathcoffey	0-02
1960	Ballykelly	0-09	Rathcoffey	2-02
1959	Monasterevin	0-14	Celbridge	1-02
1958	Raheens	1-05	Castledermot	0-03
1957	Maynooth	2-12	Moorefield	1-04
1956	Kilcullen	2 -07 0-11 (R)	Moorefield	3-04 0-04 (R)
1955	Ballykelly	1-7	Kilcullen	0-07
1954	Young Emmets	2-03	Kilcullen	1-04
1953	Castlemitchel	3-04	Young Emmets	0-04
1952	Ballymore Eustace	1-08	Castlemitchel	1-06
1951	Ellistown	1-06	Raheens	1-05
1950	Suncroft	0-08	Caragh	0-04
1949	Clane	2-03	Suncroft	1-04
1948	Maynooth	2-07	Suncroft	2-06
1947	Milltown	2-06	St Patrick's	0-05
1946	Cappagh	2-08	Castledermot	2-02
1945	Kilcullen	4-04	Kilcock	0-03
1944	Suncroft	0-06	Cappagh	0-06
1943	Ardclough	2-12	Kildangan	1-03
1942	Rheban	1-11	Straffan	1-03
1941	Rathangan	3-04	Robertstown	2-06
1940	Clane	1-07	Rathangan	0-07
1939	Moorefield	3-5	Clane	1-2
1938	Kilcock	2-8	Castledermot	1-0
1937	Moorefield	3-3	Suncroft	0-2
1936	Maynooth	1-8 2-3 (R)	The Towers	3-2 0-1 (R)
1935	Ellistown	1-6	Celbridge	0-3
1934	Leixlip	3-5 1-6 (R)	Suncroft	3-5 0-6 (R)
1933	Newbridge	0-5 2-6 (R)	Kildare Sarsfields	1-2 0-3 (R)
1932	Castledermot	2-7	Newbridge	2-3
1931	Caragh		Athy	
1930	Carbury	2-7	Athy	0-1
1929	Leixlip	2-2	Carbury	0-5
1928	Castledermot	2-2	Carbury	1-3
