= Shane Connolly (Gaelic footballer) =

Irish sportsperson (born 1989)

Personal information
- Native name: Séan Ó Conghaile (Irish)
- Nickname: Stan
- Born: 1989 (age 36–37) County Kildare, Ireland
- Occupation: Student
- Height: 6 ft 3 in (191 cm)

Sport
- Sport: Gaelic football
- Position: Goalkeeper
Club
- Years: Club
- ?-present: St Laurence's
Club titles
- Kildare titles: 1
- Leinster titles: 0
- All-Ireland Titles: 0
Inter-county
Years	County	Apps (scores)
2011-2014	Kildare	4 (0-00)
Inter-county titles
- Leinster titles: 0
- All-Irelands: 0
- NFL: 0
- All Stars: 0

Shane Connolly (born 1989 in County Kildare, Ireland) is an Irish sportsperson. He plays Gaelic football with his local club St Laurence's & has been a member of the Kildare senior inter-county team since 2011.
