= Sarsfields GAA =

Sarsfields GAA may refer to:

- Sarsfields GAA (Cork), a hurling club in Riverstown and Glanmire, Ireland
- Sarsfields GAA (Galway), a sports club in Bullaun, New Inn and Woodlawn, Ireland
- Sarsfields GAA (Newbridge), a sports club in County Kildare, Ireland
- Ardnaree Sarsfields GAA, a sports club in Ballina, County Mayo, Ireland
- Charlestown Sarsfields GAA, a sports club in County Mayo, Ireland
- Frankfurt Sarsfields GAA, a sports club in Hesse, Germany
- High Moss Sarsfields GFC, a sports club in Derrytrasna
- Lucan Sarsfields, a sports club in Dublin, Ireland
- Patrick Sarsfields GAA, a sports club in Belfast
- Thurles Sarsfields GAA, a sports club in County Tipperary, Ireland
