= Kevin O'Neill (Gaelic footballer) =

Irish Gaelic footballer

Personal information
- Born: County Kildare, Ireland

Sport
- Sport: Gaelic football
Club
- Years: Club
- Moorefield
Inter-county
- Years: County
- 2006-2010: Kildare

Kevin O'Neill is a Gaelic footballer. He plays for his local club Moorefield and was a member of the senior Kildare county team from 2006 to 2010. In April 2010, O'Neill opted out of McGeeney's team but returned a month later.
