= Ronan Sweeney =

Irish Gaelic footballer

Personal information
- Native name: Rónán Mac Suibhne (Irish)
- Born: 15 September 1980 (age 46) Newbridge, County Kildare, Ireland
- Height: 1.93 m (6 ft 4 in)

Sport
- Sport: Gaelic Football
- Position: Full Forward
Club
- Years: Club
- 1997-: Moorefield
Club titles
- Kildare titles: 9
- Leinster titles: 2
Inter-county
- Years: County
- 2000-2013: Kildare
Inter-county titles
- Leinster titles: 1
- NFL: 1
- All Stars: 1

Ronan Sweeney (born 15 September 1980) is a Gaelic footballer, who played inter-county football for Kildare and currently plays club football with Moorefield. He played for Kildare for 13 seasons between 2000 - 2013 winning a Leinster title in 2000 after defeating Dublin. He has been very influential in his club's most successful ever period, winning 9 county championships and 2 Leinster titles between 2000 and 2018.

Sweeney has been heavily involved in the Gaelic Players Association from a young age and became secretary for a period of time.

== Honours ==
- Kildare Senior Football Championship (9): 2000, 2002, 2006, 2007, 2010, 2013, 2014, 2017, 2018
- Leinster Senior Club Football Championship (2): 2006, 2017
- Leinster Club Footballer of the Year (1): 2006
- Leinster Senior Football Championship (1): 2000
- National Football League Division 2 (1):

== Coaching ==
Sweeney went straight from playing inter county football to coaching when he joined Niall Carew's backroom team in Waterford in 2013 and Sligo in 2014 and 2015. He then became head coach with his home county Kildare for 2 years in 2016 and 2017 under current manager, Cian O'Neil.
