= Curragh Camp GAA =

Gaelic games club in County Kildare, Ireland

- Sport: Gaelic games

Curragh Camp were prominent participants in County Kildare GAA championships, significant in Kildare GAA history. They won the Kildare Senior Hurling Championship seven times in 1938, 1940, 1941, 1942, 1944, 1948 and 1955. They also won the Kildare Senior Football Championship in 1948.

John Joe O'Reilly, considered to be "one of the greatest players of all time", played for Curragh Camp in the 1940s.

Curragh Camp GAA was named for Curragh Camp.
