= Monasterevin G.F.C. =

Gaelic games club in Ireland

Monasterevan
- Mainistir Eimhin
- Founded: 1880
- County: Kildare
- Nickname: The Barrowside Blues
- Colours: Blue and White
- Grounds: Fr Prendergast Park, Cowpasture, Monasterevin
- Coordinates: 53.1405°N 7.055°W

Playing kits
Standard colours

Senior Club Championships
	All Ireland	Leinster champions	Kildare champions
Football:	0	0	3
Hurling:	0	0	3

Monasterevan G.F.C. is a Gaelic football club based in Monasterevin, County Kildare, Ireland. The club competes in the County Kildare GAA board league and cup system. They were Kildare "club of the year" in 1977. In 2012, Monasterevan G.F.C. won their first Leinster Intermediate Club Football Championship, beating Raheens in the county final on a scoreline of 1-10 to 0-07 and O’Connells of Louth 0-04 to 0-03 in the Leinster.

Monasterevan were the first club in Ireland to win a football and hurling double, defeating Clane by 1-3 to 1-2, in the 1890 Kildare football final, and defeating Moorefield in the Kildare hurling final the same year.

== Rosglas ==
Rosglas (Irish for Rosegreen, sometimes written as "Ros Glas") GAA club was founded in 1974 as a juvenile club. It currently serves as a hurling club. It has won five minor championship and league titles and won county championships at under-12, under-14 and under-16 level.

== Honours ==
- Kildare Senior Football Championship: (3) 1890, 1911, 1977 Runners-up: 1907, 1910, 1912, 1973, 1976
- Leinster Intermediate Club Football Championship: 2012
- Kildare Intermediate Football Championship: (4) 1959, 1971, 2012, 2019
- Kildare Junior Football Championship: (4) 1906, 1910, 1935, 1954 Runners-up: 1930, 1945
- Kildare Senior B Football Championship: Runners-up: 1992
- Kildare Reserve "B" Football Championship: (1) 2013
- Kildare Junior C Football Championship: (1) 1998
- Kildare Under-21 B Football Shield Winners (2) 2011, 2013
- Kildare Minor Football Championship: (1) 1928 Runners-up: 1992
- Leinster Leader Cup: (2) 1973, 1974 Runners-up: 1975
- Kildare Junior Football League: (2) 1945, 1954 Runners-up: 1933, 1948;
- Kildare Junior Football League (Div 2): (2) 1993, 1995 Runners-up: 1973, 1996
- Kildare Junior Football League (Div 3B): (1) 1998
- Kildare Junior Football League (Div 4 South): (1) 2013
- Kildare Minor Football League (Div l): Runners-up: 1993
- Kildare Minor Football League (Div 2): (1) 1992
- Kildare Minor Football League (Div 3): (3) 1990, 2011, 2013 Runners-up: 2010
- Kildare Minor Football League (Div 4): (1) 2008
- Keogh Cup: 2007, 2012, 2017, 2023
- Kildare Under 21 Champions: 2016

== Notable players ==
- Hugh Hyland

== Bibliography ==
- Monasterevan GAA: Scéal An Blían 1974. Monasterevan. 1974. p. 40.
- Monasterevan GAA: Scéal Na mBlíana 1974-1981. Monasterevan. 1981. p. 48.
- Eoghan Corry (1984). Kildare GAA: A Centenary History. CLG Chill Dara. ISBN 0-9509370-0-2.
- Kildare GAA yearbook, 1972, 1974, 1978, 1979, 1980 and 2000 (in sequence especially the Millennium yearbook of 2000)
- Joan O'Flynn. Soaring Sliothars: Centenary of Kildare Camogie 1904-2004. Kildare County Camogie Board.
