= Eamonn Callaghan =

Kildare Gaelic footballer

Éamonn Callaghan
Personal information
- Native name: Éamonn Ó Ceallacháin (Irish)
- Nickname: Leper
- Born: Newbridge, County Kildare, Ireland
- Height: 1.81 m (5 ft 11 in)

Sport
- Sport: Gaelic football
- Position: Left half-forward
Club
- Years: Club
- Naas
Inter-county
- Years: County
- Kildare
Inter-county titles
- NFL: 1

Eamonn Callaghan is a former Gaelic footballer who played at senior level for the Kildare county team. He captained his county.

In 2011, Callaghan was part of the Ireland team that won the 2011 International Rules Series against Australia by 130 to 65.

Alongside Kildare veteran Eoin Doyle as manager, Callaghan won a Kildare SFC with Naas (its first for more than three decades) in 2021 and the club then advanced to the Leinster Club SFC final. In August 2022, he joined the Carlow senior football team as a performance coach under the management of Niall Carew.
