= Emmet Bolton =

Irish Gaelic footballer

Personal information
- Born: 30 November 1985 (age 40) Naas, Ireland
- Height: 1.8 m (5 ft 11 in)

Sport
- Sport: Gaelic Football
- Position: Left half back
Club
- Years: Club
- 2002–: Eadestown
Inter-county
- Years: County
- 2007–2017: Kildare
Inter-county titles
- NFL: 1

Emmet Bolton (born 30 November 1985) is a Gaelic footballer from County Kildare. He plays for the Kildare senior inter-county football team. He was named in the 2010 Opel GPA Team of the Year, and in 2011 he was nominated for an All Stars Award.

In 2011, Bolton was part of the Ireland team that won the 2011 International Rules Series against Australia by 130 to 65.
