= Kildare Senior Football Championship =

Annual Gaelic football competition in Ireland

- Irish: Craobh Peile Sinsear Chill Dara
- Founded: 1888
- Trophy: Dermot Bourke Cup
- Title holders: Sarsfields GAA (26th title)
- Most titles: Sarsfields GAA (26 titles)

The Kildare Senior Football Championship is an annual Gaelic football competition organised by Kildare GAA between the top clubs in County Kildare, Ireland. The winners of the Championship qualify to represent their county in the Leinster Club Championship, the winners of which progress to the All-Ireland Senior Club Football Championship. The current (2025) champions are Athy.

== Wins listed by club ==
#	Team	Wins	Years won
1	Sarsfields	26	*Roseberry 1945, 1947, 1950, 1951, 1952, 1982, 1986, 1993, 1994, 1999, 2001, 2005, 2012, 2015, 2016, 2019, 2026
2	Clane	17	1888, 1892, 1895, 1897, 1901, 1902, 1903, 1916, 1963, 1967, 1975, 1980, 1984, 1991, 1992, 1995, 1997
3	Naas	12	1920, 1922, 1923, 1924, 1928, 1931, 1932, 1990, 2021, 2022, 2023, 2024
4	Carbury	11	1940, 1941, 1946, 1960, 1965, 1966, 1969, 1971, 1972, 1974, 1985
5	Raheens	10	1935, 1936, 1943, 1964, 1968, 1973, 1976, 1978, 1979, 1981
5	Round Towers	10	1927, 1929, 1930, 1938, 1954, 1959, 1961, 1996, 1998, 2003
5	Moorefield	10	1962, 2000, 2002, 2006, 2007, 2010, 2013, 2014, 2017, 2018
8	Athy	8	1933, 1934, 1937, 1942, 1987, 2011, 2020, 2025
9	Kilcock	5	1914, 1917, 1955, 1957, 1958
10	Ellistown	4	1889, 1891, 1939, 1944
11	Caragh	3	1918, 1919, 1926
11	Monasterevin	3	1890, 1911, 1977
11	Johnstownbridge	3	1983, 1988, 1989
14	Maynooth	2	1896, 1913
15	St Conleth's	1	1921
15	Rathangan	1	1925
15	Curragh	1	1948
15	Ardclough	1	1949
15	Ballymore	1	1953
15	Military College	1	1956
15	Eadestown	1	1970
15	Allenwood	1	2004
15	Celbridge	1	2008
15	St Laurence's	1	2009

Notes:

- Sarsfields includes 9 titles won under the Roseberry name.
- Round Towers includes 1 title won under the Kildare St. Patrick's name.
- Ellistown includes 2 titles won under the Mountrice Blunts name.

== Finals listed by year ==
Year	Winner	Score	Opponent	Score
2026	Sarsfields	1-14	Maynooth	1-10
2025	Athy	1-17	Naas	0-18
2024	Naas	1-07	Celbridge	1-06
2023	Naas	0-13	Celbridge	0-11
2022	Naas	1-12	Clane	0-06
2021	Naas	0-14	Sarsfields	0-12
2020	Athy	1-11	Moorefield	0-12
2019	Sarsfields	0-15 R:2-15	Moorefield	2-09 R:2-09
2018	Moorefield	2-12	Athy	2-09
2017	Moorefield	0-11	Celbridge	0-09
2016	Sarsfields	2-13	Moorefield	0-15
2015	Sarsfields	0-17	Athy	1-12
2014	Moorefield	0-16 R:1-15	Sarsfields	1-13 R:1-06
2013	Moorefield	2-14	Sarsfields	0-13
2012	Sarsfields	2-11	Carbury	0-11
2011	Athy	2-11	Carbury	2-07
2010	Moorefield	0-13	Sarsfields	1-08
2009	St Laurence's	1-13	Moorefield	0-06
2008	Celbridge	0-07 R:1-09	Sarsfields	0-07 R:0-10
2007	Moorefield	2-09	Sarsfields	0-09
2006	Moorefield	0-10	Allenwood	0-09
2005	Sarsfields	0-11 R:1-11	St Laurence's	1-08 R:0-08
2004	Allenwood	0-11	St Laurence's	0-07
2003	Round Towers	2-14	Kilcock	1-09
2002	Moorefield	1-08	Sarsfields	0-07
2001	Sarsfields	0-10	Moorefield	0-08
2000	Moorefield	2-13	Kilcock	2-07
1999	Sarsfields	0-15	Allenwood	1-05
1998	Round Towers	2-08	Clane	0-04
1997	Clane	0-13	Sarsfields	0-08
1996	Round Towers	1-13	Johnstownbridge	0-10
1995	Clane	3-17	Athy	0-08
1994	Sarsfields	2-15	Johnstownbridge	0-09
1993	Sarsfields	0-11 R:1-15	Clane	0-11 R:0-16
1992	Clane	0-09	St Laurence's	0-07
1991	Clane	2-10	Naas	1-06
1990	Naas	1-14	Clane	2-09
1989	Johnstownbridge	1-07	Clane	1-05
1988	Johnstownbridge	0-10 1-10 (R)	Carbury	0-10 0-08 (R)
1987	Athy	2-09	Johnstownbridge	0-09
1986	Sarsfields	0-11	St Mary's, Leixlip	0-08
1985	Carbury	1-09	Raheens	0-05
1984	Clane	1-09	Carbury	0-10
1983	Johnstownbridge	2-07	Sarsfields	1-08
1982	Sarsfields	2-11	St Laurence's	1-04
1981	Raheens	2-09	Sarsfields	1-07
1980	Clane	1-07	Raheens	1-06
1979	Raheens	0-15	Carbury	0-10
1978	Raheens	3-14	Athy	2-06
1977	Monasterevin	2-08	Carbury	2-06
1976	Raheens	2-05	Monasterevin	0-06
1975	Clane	1-06 2-07 (R)	Carbury	0-09 1-06 (R)
1974	Carbury	2-09	Ballyteague	0-05
1973	Raheens	1-07	Monasterevin	0-04
1972	Carbury	3-14	Ellistown	1-07
1971	Carbury	1-11	Allenwood	1-08
1970	Eadestown	1-09	Carbury	0-10
1969	Carbury	0-10	Clane	0-07
1968	Raheens	2-07	Carbury	1-08
1967	Clane	4-06	Carbury	1-09
1966	Carbury	2-14	Raheens	0-07
1965	Carbury	3-13	Moorefield	1-09
1964	Raheens	3-10	Clane	1-09
1963	Clane	1-08	Round Towers	2-01
1962	Moorefield	2-12	Kilcullen	0-02
1961	Round Towers	3-08	Carbury	1-11
1960	Carbury	2-09	Round Towers	0-05
1959	Round Towers	5-05	Clane	0-07
1958	Kilcock	3-12	Round Towers	3-08
1957	Kilcock	1-06	Round Towers	1-05
1956	Military College	1-06	Ballymore	0-04
1955	Kilcock	3-13 0-09 (R)	Sarsfields	4-10 1-04 (R)
1954	Round Towers	0-03	Carbury	0-02
1953	Ballymore	1-06	Carbury	1-05
1952	Sarsfields	2-06	Carbury	0-04
1951	Sarsfields	2-11	North Division	1-07
1950	Sarsfields	1-09	Carbury	2-03
1949	Ardclough	1-08 1-11 (R)	Curragh	1-08 2-06 (R)
1948	Curragh	2-07	Sarsfields	2-04
1947	Sarsfields	1-07	Curragh	1-05
1946	Carbury	0-11	Athy	0-07
1945	Sarsfields	2-09	Raheens	1-05
1944	Ellistown	1-04	Carbury	0-04
1943	Raheens	1-03 1-01 (R) 1-04 (2R)	Ellistown	1-03 1-01 (R) 1-02 (2R)
1942	Athy	0-06 1-06 (R)	Carbury	0-06 0-06 (R)
1941	Carbury	1-09	Athy	1-06
1940	Carbury	1-05	Kilcock	0-04
1939	Eiilistown	3-02	Kildare St Patrick's	1-03
1938	Kildare St Patrick's	w/o	Ellistown	conc.
1937	Athy	3-06	Sarsfields	1-06
1936	Raheens	1-07	McDonagh	1-06
1935	Raheens	6-03	Kildare St Brigid's	1-00
1934	Athy	1-03 2-06 (R)	Raheens	0-06 1-04 (R)
1933	Athy	2-06	Rathangan	1-04
1932	Naas	2-04	Curragh	1-06
1931	Naas	6-07	Kildare Round Towers	0-03
1930	Kildare Round Towers	2-04	Naas	0-05
1929	Kildare Round Towers	3-02	Naas	1-02
1928	Naas	3-03	Rathangan	2-04
1927	Kildare Round Towers	2-06	Athy	1-05
1926	Caragh	3-04	Athy	3-03
1925	Rathangan	2-04	Caragh	1-03
1924	Naas	1-01 1-02 (R)	Kildare Round Towers	0-04 0-03 (R)
1923	Naas	2-05	Athy	0-00
1922	Naas	1-08	Caragh	1-03
1921*	St Conleth's	1-02	Caragh	1-12
1920	Naas	1-06	Caragh	0-08
1919	Caragh	2-04	Kilcock	2-01
1918	Caragh	2-02	Roseberry	0-05
1917	Kilcock	5-00	Kilcullen	2-01
1916	Clane	2-02	Maynooth	0-02
1915	Roseberry	0-06	Maynooth	1-00
1914	Kilcock	1-04	Clane	0-04
1913	Maynooth	2-01	Kilcock	1-01
1912	Roseberry	2-06	Monasterevin	1-02
1911	Monasterevin	2-01	Roseberry	0-02
1910*	Roseberry	1-02 0-03 (R) 1-03 (2R)	Monasterevin	1-01 0-03 (R) 1-01 (2R)
1909	Roseberry	0-04	Clane	0-01
1908*	Roseberry		Clane	
1907	Roseberry	1-04 0-07 (R)	Monasterevin	1-04 0-04 (R)
1906	Roseberry	0-07 0-05 (R) 1-11 (2R)	Clane	0-07 0-05 (R) 1-02 (2R)
1905	Roseberry	0-10	Clane	0-06
1904	Roseberry	0-14	Naas	0-03
1903	Clane	1-10	Prosperous	0-07
1902	Clane	4-07	Moorefield	2-03
1901	Clane	4-15	Prosperous	0-03
1900	No Competition			
1899	No Competition			
1898	No Competition			
1897	Clane		Maynooth	
1896	Maynooth	7-09	Sallins	0-03
1895	Clane	0-08 0-08 (R)	Maynooth	0-07 0-01 (R)
1894	No Competition			
1893	No Competition			
1892	Clane	0-03	Kilcullen	0-02
1891	Mountrice Blunts	1-04	Kildare	1-01
1890*	Monasterevin	0-01 1-03 (R)	Clane	0-02 1-02 (R)
1889	Mountrice Blunts	0-02	Kildare	0-01
1888	Clane	0-04	Naas	0-00

- For those with an * beside the year see below:
- 1921 - Won on an objection
- 1910 - Replayed after disputed point in first game
- 1908 - According to Eoghan Corry's Kildare GAA A Centenary History, Clane were runners up but others regard Allen as runners up
- 1890 - Replayed after objection
