= St Laurence's GAA =

Gaelic Athletic Association club in south County Kildare, Ireland

St Laurence's
- Naomh Lorcán
- Founded: 1957
- County: Kildare
- Nickname: The Larries
- Colours: Amber and Red
- Grounds: Old Grange
- Coordinates: 53°02′32″N 6°51′27″W

Playing kits
Standard colours

Senior Club Championships
	All Ireland	Leinster champions	Kildare champions
Football:	0	0	1
Camogie:	0	0	15

St Laurence's GAA (Irish: CLG Naomh Lorcán) is a Gaelic Athletic Association club in south County Kildare, Ireland. The club was founded in 1957.

== History ==
St Laurence's GAA club was formed in 1957 following the amalgamation of two pre-existing clubs representing Narraghmore and Ballitore. The club grounds, at Oldgrange, were purchased in 1975 and new clubhouse dressing room facilities were developed in 1992 and again in 1999.

The club, which originally and predominantly played Gaelic football, won the Kildare Intermediate Football Championship in 1982. St. Laurence's GAA won its first Kildare Senior Football Championship in 2009, having defeated Moorefield GAA on a scoreline of 1-13 to 0-06 in the 2009 final.

St. Laurence's GAA started fielding hurling teams at underage level in 1998. In 2005, St. Laurence's fielded its first-ever adult team, which went on to win a Kildare league title in 2008. St. Laurence's hurling club won the Kildare Junior Hurling Championship in 2011, followed by a Kildare Intermediate League title in 2012.

In camogie, Sheila Norton founded a camogie club in Ballitore in March 1934. The club was a junior finalist in 1940. Revived in 1980, and using the St. Laurence's name, the club won the junior championship and league. The club went on to win the Intermediate championship in 1989, with a victory over Broadford. A number players with the club, Patricia Keatley, Melanie Treacy and Michelle Aspell, were selected on the Kildare camogie team of the century.

== Facilities ==
St. Laurence's GAA club, based at Oldgrange in the parish of Narraghmore in County Kildare, covers the parish villages of Narraghmore, Kilmead, Booley, Calverstown, Kilgowan, Brewel, Ballymount, Crookstown, Ballitore and Mullaghmast.

The facilities at Oldgrange, opened in 1975, are used for men's football, ladies football, hurling, camogie, basketball, badminton and bowls. St. Laurence's also houses a community complex, which includes a bar, indoor sports hall, outdoor children's playground and a 750-metre athletics track.

The badminton club, St. Laurence's Badminton Club, was established in 2006 and has both junior and adult sections. The basketball club, the Larrie Birds Basketball Club, was established in 2015 and hosted its first ever competitive basketball matches in November 2015. St. Laurence's Bowls Club, based at the St. Laurence's Complex Hall, hosts mixed ability and mixed age teams for competitive play and social recreation.

== Honours ==
- Kildare Senior Football Championship (1): 2009
- Kildare Intermediate Football Championship (1): 1980
- Kildare Junior A Football Championship (1): 1978
- Kildare Junior Hurling Championship: (1): 2011
- Kildare Intermediate Hurling Championship: (1): 2012
- Leinster Junior Camogie Club Championship (2) 1996, 2004
- Kildare Senior Camogie Championship: (15) 1992, 1994, 1995, 1996, 1997, 1998, 1999, 2000, 2001, 2002, 2003, 2004, 2007, 2008, 2009
- Kildare Intermediate Camogie Championship (1) 1989
- Kildare Junior Camogie Championship (1): 1980
