= Raheens GAA =

Gaelic games club in County Kildare, Ireland

Raheens
- Na Raithíní
- Founded: 1925
- County: Kildare
- Nickname: The Heens
- Colours: Blue and Saffron
- Grounds: Tom Lawler Park, Gingerstown, Caragh
- Coordinates: 53.23428°N 6.71962°W

Playing kits
Standard colours

Senior Club Championships
	All Ireland	Leinster champions	Kildare champions
Football:	0	1	10
Hurling:	-	-	8

Raheens /ræˈhiːnz/ is a Gaelic football club based in Caragh, County Kildare, Ireland, winner of the Leinster senior club championship in 1981, 10 county senior football championships, first winners of the Kildare club of the year in 1973 and winners again in 1976. The separate hurling club, formerly known as Éire Óg, has now amalgamated to become Éire Óg-Corrachoill.

== History ==
Raheens won the first of ten Kildare titles in 1935 with a 6–3 to 1–0 win over Kildare St. Brigid's. They won their second in 1936 and third in 1964. A win in 1981 led to Leinster club championship honours. In 2017, Raheens beat Kilcock to win the Intermediate Championship Final.

== Honours ==
As "Raheens"

- Leinster Senior Club Football Championship: Winners 1981
- Kildare Senior Football Championship: Winners (10) 1935, 1936, 1943, 1964, 1968, 1973, 1976, 1978, 1979, 1981
- Kildare Intermediate Football Championship: Winners (2) 1958, 2017
- Kildare Junior Football Championship: Winners (2) 1928, 1974* (1974 Won Junior B Championship and defeated Junior A Championship winners)

As "Éire Óg"

- Kildare Senior Hurling Championship Winners (8) 1964, 1965, 1966, 1967, 1969, 1970, 1971, 1972

As "Prosperous"

- Kildare Senor Camogie Championship (8) 1954, 1972, 1974, 1975, 1976, 1977, 1980, 1981
- Kildare Junior Camogie Championship (1) 1939
- Kildare Senor Camogie League (8) 1974, 1975, 1976, 1977, 1981, 1984, 1985, 1986
- Kildare Senior Football Championship Finalists 1901

== Bibliography ==
- Kildare GAA: A Centenary History, by Eoghan Corry, CLG Chill Dara, 1984, ISBN 0-9509370-0-2 hb ISBN 0-9509370-1-0 pb
- Kildare GAA yearbook, 1972, 1974, 1978, 1979, 1980 and 2000- in sequence especially the Millennium yearbook of 2000
- Soaring Sliothars: Centenary of Kildare Camogie 1904–2004 by Joan O'Flynn Kildare County Camogie Board.
