= Naas GAA =

Gaelic games club in County Kildare, Ireland

Naas
- Nás na Ríogh
- Founded: 1887
- County: Kildare
- Colours: Blue and white
- Grounds: Naas GAA Grounds
- Coordinates: 53°13′49″N 6°39′48″W

Playing kits
Standard colours

Senior Club Championships
| | All Ireland | Leinster champions | Kildare champions |
|---|---|---|---|
| Football: | 0 | 0 | 12 |
| Hurling: | 0 | 0 | 14 |
| Camogie: | 0 | 0 | 8 |

Naas is a Gaelic Athletic Association (GAA) club in Naas, County Kildare, Ireland, winner of twelve Kildare county senior football championships, fourteen senior hurling championships, four senior camogie championships and Kildare club of the year in 1981.

== History ==
Naas played the Curragh on 15 February 1885 to become one of eight clubs which share the distinction of being the first to play in a Gaelic football match. The GAA Naas Sunbursts and Naas Crom-A-Boo were listed as unaffiliated clubs in 1896 while nearby Thomastown was an affiliated club. Naas moved to Spooner's Field opposite the racecourse grandstand in 1913. Father Brennan park was opened in 1930.

In January 2025, Naas received widespread media coverage over its decision to appoint controversial former Derry manager Rory Gallagher as a coach.

== Hurling ==
Naas has won the Kildare senior hurling championship thirteen times. The first of these titles came in 1951 the team was captained by Big Noise Sheridan and Naas successfully defended the title the following year. The club then entered a barren spell and it was not until some 42 years later in 1994 that the Naas men, captained by Richie Coyle, reclaimed the crown by defeating Coill Dubh. This was the beginning of a golden spell for the club, with further titles following in 1997, 2000 and 2001. The Kildare team that won the Christy Ring Cup in 2018 was captained by Naas’ Brian Byrne. After a seventeen year gap, Naas reclaimed the senior hurling championship in 2019, successfully defended their title in 2020 and completed their first three in a row in 2021.

== Grounds ==
Naas play at grounds in the north of the town, on the Sallins Road, in the Oldtown Demesne townland. Amenities include three floodlit pitches.

== Notable players ==
- Eamonn Callaghan, senior Kildare player and All Star Nominee 2010.
- Eoin Doyle, senior Kildare player and Kildare captain for 2016.
- Barry Reynolds, senior goalkeeper.

== Notable managers ==
Tom Mullally managed the club's hurling team.

== Honours ==
Football

- Kildare Senior Football Championship: (12) 1920, 1922, 1923, 1924, 1928, 1931, 1932, 1990, 2021, 2022, 2023, 2024
- Kildare Intermediate Football Championship: (2) 1984, 2004
- Kildare Junior Football Championship: (3) 1913, 1919, 1981
- Kildare Junior B Football Championship (1) 1952
- Kildare Under 21 Football Championship: (3) 1984, 2016, 2019
- Kildare Minor Football Championship: (8) 1934, 1953, 1981, 1983, 2016, 2018, 2019, 2024
- All Ireland U-14 Féile Div 1: 2014
- All Ireland U-14 Féile Div 2: 2006

Hurling

- All-Ireland Intermediate Club Hurling Championship: (1) 2021
- Leinster Intermediate Hurling Championship: (1) 2021
- Kildare Senior Hurling Championship: (14) 1951, 1952, 1994, 1997, 2001, 2002, 2019, 2020, 2021, 2022, 2023, 2024, 2025, 2026
- Kildare Junior Hurling Championship (7) 1942, 1946, 1947, 1948, 1964, 1972, 1993, 2019
- Kildare Under 21 Hurling Championship 1994, 2009, 2011, 2012, 2013, 2016, 2017, 2018, 2019
- Kildare Minor Hurling Championship: 1955, 1977, 1981, 1983, 1986, 1987, 1991, 2007, 2009, 2010, 2013, 2014, 2015, 2016, 2018, 2019, 2021, 2022, 2023, 2024
- All Ireland U-14 Féile Div 2: 2014, 2018
- All Ireland U-14 Féile Div 3: 2006

Camogie

- Kildare Senior Camogie Championship (8) 1942, 1959, 1960, 2018, 2022, 2023, 2024, 2025
- Kildare Senior Camogie League 1942, 1955, 1957

== Bibliography ==
- To Spooner's Lane And Beyond, Naas GAA 1887-1987 Céad Bliain Ag Fás by Liam McManus, Naas GAA 1987, 214pp.
- Kildare GAA: A Centenary History, by Eoghan Corry, CLG Chill Dara, 1984, ISBN 0-9509370-0-2 hb ISBN 0-9509370-1-0 pb
- Kildare GAA yearbook, 1972, 1974, 1978, 1979, 1980 and 2000- in sequence especially the Millennium yearbook of 2000
- Soaring Sliothars: Centenary of Kildare Camogie 1904-2004 by Joan O'Flynn Kildare County Camogie Board. The Eoin Hughes memorial cup 1947-1994 The Michael O'leary cup 1953-1999
