= Johnstownbridge GAA =

Gaelic games club in County Kildare, Ireland

Johnstownbridge
- Droichead Baile Sheáin
- Founded: 1942
- County: Kildare
- Nickname: The Bridge, JTB
- Colours: Blue, white and green
- Grounds: Gurteen, Johnstownbridge
- Coordinates: 53.39220°N 6.84683°W

Playing kits
Standard colours

Senior Club Championships
	All Ireland	Leinster champions	Kildare champions
Football:	-	-	3
Camogie:	-	-	8

Johnstownbridge GAA is a Gaelic Athletic Association (GAA) club in the village of Johnstownbridge, County Kildare, Ireland, Winner of eleven senior county championships across football and camogie and Kildare club of the year in 1983.

== Gaelic Football ==
Johnstownbridge fields two teams at senior level and have approximately 50 players over 17 years of age. Underage teams are fielded as the parish of Balyna shared with Clogherinkoe Gaa. Paul Cribbin and Daniel Flynn are currently part of the Kildare Senior squad for 2022.

== Hurling ==
Johnstownbridge players play their hurling with Broadford GAA.

== Camogie ==
Johnstownbridge's Camogie team was formed in 1969 and was later reorganised in 1994 placing special attention to provide a solid underage structure. They first tasted success in 2000 winning the Coiste Chontae an Chláir Shield at Feile na nGael and have gone from strength to strength since. They now field teams at all levels from U7s to Senior.

== Honours ==
Football

- Kildare Senior Football Championship: (3) 1983, 1988, 1989
- Kildare Intermediate Football Championship: (2) 1978, 2013
- Kildare Junior Football Championship: (2) 1967, 1975
- Kildare Senior Football League Division 2: (2) 2010, 2025

Camogie

- All-Ireland Intermediate Club Camogie Championship: 2018
- All-Ireland Junior Club Camogie Championship: (2) 2015, 2017
- Leinster Intermediate Club Camogie Championship: 2017
- Leinster Junior Camogie Championship: (2) 2015, 2016
- Kildare Senior Camogie Championship: (8) 2011, 2012, 2013, 2014, 2015, 2016, 2017, 2019

== Bibliography ==
- Kildare GAA: A Centenary History, by Eoghan Corry, CLG Chill Dara, 1984, ISBN 0-9509370-0-2 hb ISBN 0-9509370-1-0 pb
- Kildare GAA yearbook, 1972, 1974, 1978, 1979, 1980 and 2000- in sequence especially the Millennium yearbook of 2000
- Soaring Sliothars: Centenary of Kildare Camogie 1904–2004 by Joan O'Flynn Kildare County Camogie Board.
