= St Conleth's Park =

Gaelic Athletic Association stadium in County Kidlare, Ireland

- Páirc Naoimh Conlaith
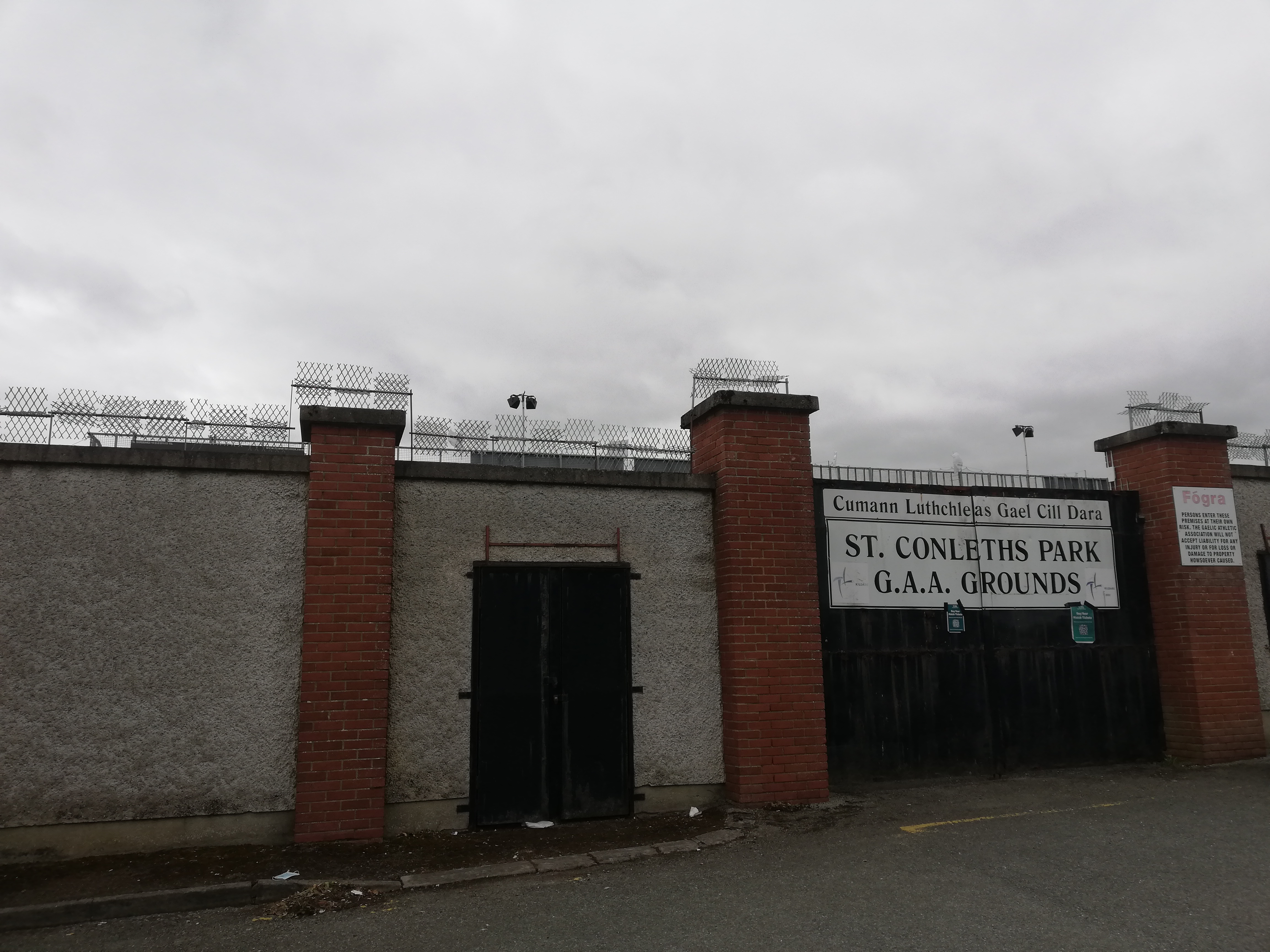
- Interactive map of St Conleth's Park
- Location: Newbridge, County Kildare, W12 X067, Ireland
- Coordinates: 53°10′45.88″N 6°47′39.77″W
- Owner: Kildare GAA
- Capacity: 15,000 (3,000 seated) Capacity history: 13,000 (2010) 8,000 (2011) 6,200 (2012) 8,200 (2018–2024)
- Surface: grass
- Field size: 137 × 80 m (150 × 87 yds)
- Field shape: rectangle
- Public transit: Newbridge railway station

Cedral St Conleth's Park (Irish: Páirc Naoimh Conlaith) is a GAA stadium in Newbridge, County Kildare, Ireland. It is the county ground of Kildare's Gaelic football, hurling, and Ladies' Gaelic Football teams.

The park is named for Conleth (Conláed; c. AD 450–519), the parish's patron saint.

== History ==
Formerly the site of Newbridge Barracks, it served as the town's greyhound racing track from 1948 until 1968.

The controversy known as "Newbridge or Nowhere" surrounding a Gaelic football match played in the 2018 All-Ireland Senior Football Championship between Kildare and Mayo took place at St Conleth's Park in June 2018.

In May 2023, following a naming-rights agreement, the venue was branded as "Cedral St Conleth's Park", Formally known as Tegral, Cedral are part of the global building materials group Etex.

== Ground ==
The ground formerly had a capacity of 13,000, but following a health and safety audit in 2011, this was reduced to 8,000 and subsequently to 6,200. In 2024 the redevelopment was completed bringing the capacity of the stadium to 15,000, including 3,000 seats in a newly constructed stand. State-of-the-art floodlights were also installed.

== Greyhound racing ==
Greyhound racing at St Conleth's Park started on 30 April 1948. After only one year the GAA governing body banned racing around all of their pitches which meant the greyhound racing was suspended. However it restarted on 21 June 1950 with racing taking place over race distances of 310, 350, 525 and 550 yards and 350 yards hurdles. The racing lasted a further eighteen years up until 1968, when it was decided that the greyhound operation would be better suited outside of the town at venue where racing could take place on a purpose built stadium. That stadium was Newbridge Greyhound Stadium which opened in 1972.

=== Track records ===
Yards	Greyhound	Time	Date
310	Feale Ranger	17.65	14.06.1961
350	P For Poor	19.88	03.07.1953
550	Claverstown Flower	31.89	05.10.1957
350 H	Chestnut Bridge	21.08	11.10.1950
350 H	Jigger Lee	21.08	20.11.1950

== See also ==
- List of Gaelic Athletic Association stadiums
- List of stadiums in Ireland by capacity
