= Carbury GAA =

Gaelic games club in County Kildare, Ireland

Carbury
- Cairbre
- Founded: 1925
- County: Kildare
- Colours: Gold and Blue
- Grounds: Parsonstown, Ardkill, Carbury
- Coordinates: 53.346247°N 6.926193°W

Playing kits
Standard colours

Senior Club Championships
	All Ireland	Leinster champions	Kildare champions
Football:	0	0	11
Camogie:	0	0	4

Carbury GAA is a Gaelic Athletic Association (GAA) club in County Kildare, Ireland, winner of 11 Kildare county senior football championships and participants in eight successive county finals between 1965 and 1972. Ollie Crinnigan and (an All Star in 1978) and Pat Mangan (replacement All Star on two occasions) were on the Kildare football team of the millennium.

== History ==
Though the present Carbury club was founded in 1925, local tradition holds that football was played in the parish since pre-GAA times. RIC records from 1890 show that Kirkpatrick CJ Kickhams club had 30 members, with the officers listed as Michael Mooney, Walter Broderick and John Tracey. Carbury teams reached the quarter-finals of the championship in 1897 and 1905.

== Gaelic Football ==
The Bourke family, including Dermot (after whom the county senior football championship trophy is named) and John and William Hynan were the backbone of early Carbury teams. After winning the Intermediate Championship in 1930 Carbury have had an unbroken run in Kildare senior football, playing in four successive finals as they won three titles between 1940 and 1946. The minor team of 1959 broke through at senior level to play in eight successive county finals. They travelled to New York in 1973 and beat New York in two challenge matches and reached the final of the Kilmacud sevens in 1973, losing to Waterville. Also, Jack Carey is one of only two players with seven County Championship medals. They also reached a county final in 2011 but lost to Athy.

== Hurling ==
Carbury players hurl with Broadford.

== Camogie ==
Carbury affiliated 1933-45 with Stoirin Burke as their captain, formerly of Dominican, Eccles Street, described as "one of Ireland’s best players." Ticknevin and Carbury both fielded teams in the 1950s. The club revived in 1983 and won All Ireland Feile na nGael Division 2 in 1985.

== Honours ==
- Kildare Senior Football Championship Winners (11) 1940, 1941, 1946, 1960, 1965, 1966, 1969, 1971, 1972, 1974, 1985
- Kildare Centenary Cup (1) 1984
- Senior F League (Leinster Leader Cup): (7) 1938, 1940, 1943, 1961, 1965, 1972, 1982
- Kildare Minor Football Championship (2) 1959, 1984
- Kildare Intermediate Football Championship (1) 1930
- Kildare Junior Football Championship: (1) 1926
- Kildare Senior Camogie Championship (4) 1936, 1937, 1940, 1941
- Kildare Junior Camogie Championship (1) 1988
- Kildare Senior Camogie League (1) 1937

== Bibliography ==
- Kildare GAA: A Centenary History, by Eoghan Corry, CLG Chill Dara, 1984, ISBN 0-9509370-0-2 hb ISBN 0-9509370-1-0 pb
- Kildare GAA yearbook, 1972, 1974, 1978, 1979, 1980 and 2000- in sequence especially the Millennium yearbook of 2000
- Soaring Sliothars: Centenary of Kildare Camogie 1904-2004 by Joan O'Flynn Kildare County Camogie Board.

== Notable players ==
- Ollie Crinnigan
- Pat Mangan
- Morgan O'Flaherty
- Eoghan O'Flaherty
- Eoin Cully
- Aaron ONeill
- Tommy Gill
