= Moorefield GAA =

Gaelic games club in County Kildare, Ireland

Moorefield
- Achadh Mhórdha
- Founded: 1884
- County: Kildare
- Nickname: The Moores
- Colours: Green and White
- Grounds: Pollardstown
- Coordinates: 53.172431°N 6.849471°W

Playing kits
Standard colours

Senior Club Championships
	All Ireland	Leinster champions	Kildare champions
Football:	0	2	10
Hurling:	0	0	3

Moorefield is a Gaelic Athletic Association club in the parish of Newbridge County Kildare, Ireland, winner of two Leinster Club Senior Football Championships, ten Senior County Football Championships and three Senior County Hurling Championships.

== History ==
Folklore records that, in 1882, two brothers, John O'Kelly of Moorefield Road and James O'Kelly of Ballymany were instrumental in forming the first football team in Newbridge. Calling themselves the JJ O'Kellys they played matches against Mountrice, Eyrefield, Monasterevin, Kildare town and Milltown. In 1884, when the GAA was formed, the club changed its name from JJ O'Kelly's to Moorefield, the name of a townland in southern Newbridge.

== Gaelic football ==
Moorefield beat Kilcullen in a one-sided county final in 1962, 2–11 to 0–2 to claim their first Kildare Senior Football Championship title. Carbury defeated Moorefield in the 1965 final.

Moorefield re-emerged in the 1990s. A run of success that started with the minor championship of 1989(Under the name Pollardstown) and two more Leinster Leader Cups in 1994 and 1996 culminated in three successive finals 2000–2002, two of which were won. In 2000 Moorefield beat Kilcock by 2–13 to 2–7 after goals from Cian O'Neill and gave them a 2–10 to 0–1 lead at half-time. Sarsfields overhauled Moorefield towards the end of the 2001 final in a closely contested decider to win 0–10 to 0–8. In 2002 Moorefield won their third title, beating near neighbours Sarsfields 1–8 to 0–6 thanks to a Ronan Sweeney penalty seconds into the second half. Moorefield were defeated in two Leinster club semi-final, by O'Hanrahan's 0–12 to 0–11 in 2000 and by Mattock Rangers by 3–13 to 2–10 in 2002.

The glory days of Moorefield, and indeed Newbridge football rose to a higher plane in 2006, when The Moors beat Allenwood in the Kildare Senior Football Championship final, which lead on to a first Leinster Senior Club Football Championship victory for the town, beating Rhode of Offaly on a wind-swept Sunday in December in the aptly named O'Moore Park, County Laois. They were decisive victors, on a day that all present hoped would lead to a clear-cut rather than a marginal victory. It proved to be so, with a final score of 3 goals and 6 points (15 points) to 8 points for Rhode.

== Hurling ==
Moorefield's 1–10 to 0–3 victory over Broadford in the 1963 county final bridged a twenty-year gap for Moorefield. Davey Dennis captained the team, Mick Leahy scored 0–7 of the total, Billy Quinn came on as substitute to score the goal, and Ned Goff, Jim Barker, Harry Fay, Colm Ruffley, Paddy Moore, Tom O'Connell and Stephen Schwer all collected medals as a result of the victory over a much-changed Broadford team.

Moorefield won their third senior title in 1991 beating Coil Dubh in a replay, with the McMullen and Murray families making up six of the starting fifteen. Moorefield went on to represent Kildare in the Leinster Hurling Championship. They played Longford Slashers in the first round, which also went to a replay, then took on the mighty Birr in the next round.

Moorefield won the replayed 2010 Intermediate Hurling Championship against Naas, 1–13 to 0–11 in Celbridge. The replay was an entertaining and hard-fought game between both sides at St. Conleths park ending on a score of 1–11 a piece, leaving the title to be decided for a later date. On the day Moorefield dominated the majority of the game, Moorefield led 0–10 0–07 at the interval. A goal from a 21-yard free in front of the goal by Gavin Sunderland put the Moores 6 points in front midway through the 2nd half. Moorefield defended like their life depended on it in the last few moments to keep a tremendous fight back from Naas from scoring any inspirational goals. Moorefield will now contest in the Senior ranks for 2011.

== Notable players ==
- Cian O'Neill
- Sos Dowling
- Ronan Sweeney
- Kevin O'Neill

== Titles won ==
- Leinster Senior Club Football Championship Winners 2006, 2017
- Leinster Senior Club Football Championship: Semi-finalists 2000, 2002, 2007.
- Kildare Senior Football Championship 1962, 2000, 2002, 2006, 2007, 2010, 2013, 2014, 2017, 2018
- Kildare Senior Hurling Championship Winner 1943, 1963, 1991
- Kildare Senior Football Championship: Finalists 1965
- Senior Football League: 1958, 1959, 1960, 1994, 1996, 2008, 2010, 2011,2013, 2015, 2017.
- Kildare Senior B Football Championship (6) 1994, 1995, 1997, 2012, 2014, 2016.
- Kildare Intermediate B Football Championship (1) 1996
- Kildare Intermediate Football Championship Winners (2) 1937, 1939
- Kildare Junior Football Championship: (3) 1932, 1948, 2002.
- Kildare Junior B Football Championship: (2) 2006. 2007
- Jack Higgins Cup 1994, 2006, 2012
- Kildare Junior C Football Championship: (3) 1992, 2000, 2001.
- Kildare U-21 Football Championship Winners (4) 1997, 1998, 2000, 2003
- Kildare Minor Football Championship Winners (4)1989, 1997, 2003, 2015
- Kildare Intermediate Hurling Championship (2) 1998, 2010
- Kildare Junior Hurling Championship (6) 1941, 1961, 1979, 1987, 1997 & 2006
- Kildare Junior Football League (1) 1936
- Kildare Junior Hurling League (1) 1972
- Kildare Senior B Camogie Championship (2) 1998, 1999
- Kildare Intermediate Camogie Championship (1) 1994
- Kildare Junior Camogie Championship (1) 1992

== Bibliography ==
- Curragh Moorefield GAA Club (1984).
- Kildare GAA: A Centenary History, by Eoghan Corry, CLG Chill Dara, 1984, ISBN 0-9509370-0-2 hb ISBN 0-9509370-1-0 pb
- Kildare GAA yearbook, 1972, 1974, 1978, 1979, 1980 and 2000– in sequence especially the Millennium yearbook of 2000
- Soaring Sliothars: Centenary of Kildare Camogie 1904–2004 by Joan O'Flynn Kildare County Camogie Board
- Our Club history book Moorefield GAA Club – Our Club, Our Town 1884- 2014

== Current Panel ==
TBC
