= Athy GAA =

Gaelic games club

Athy
- Ath Í
- Founded: 1887
- County: Kildare
- Colours: Red and White
- Grounds: Geraldine Park, Athy
- Coordinates: 52.993048°N 6.969721°W

Playing kits
Standard colours

Senior Club Championships
	All Ireland	Leinster champions	Kildare champions
Football:	0	0	8
Hurling:	0	0	3

Athy GAA is a Gaelic Athletic Association (GAA) club in Athy, County Kildare, Ireland. The club has won seven Kildare Senior Football Championship titles.

== Gaelic football ==
Athy has won several Kildare Senior Football Championship titles. The 2011 title was won in October 2011, in St Conleths Park Newbridge, when Michael Foley captained the side to victory against Carbury. The final score was 2-11 to 2-07. The club also won the title in 2020.

== Hurling ==
Teams representing Athy won the Kildare Senior Hurling Championship on several occasions in the 20th century.

== Camogie ==
Athy advertised for a reunion of players in 1909. Clan Bridge and St Patrick's clubs from Athy affiliated separately in 1935. Athy beat Ballitore in the 1940 junior final. Ballyroe St Anne's was formed in 1959. Coached by Jimmy Hickey, they won the 1961 senior league, Brigid Moran scored seven goals as they won the 1961 county final and they went on to win four county titles in a row before disbanding suddenly in 1964. Ballyroe won the Senior League in 1960, 1961, 1963 and 1964.

== Honours ==
=== Gaelic football ===
- Kildare Senior Football Championship (8): 1933, 1934, 1937, 1942, 1987, 2011, 2020, 2025
- Kildare U-21 Football Championship (2): 2010, 2011
- Kildare Minor Football Championship (7): 1956 1966, 1973, 2008, 2009, 2010, 2013

=== Hurling ===
- Kildare Senior Hurling Championship (3): 1928, 1936, 1959
- Kildare Intermediate Hurling Championship (5): 1937, 1943, 1950, 1958, 1989
- Kildare Junior Hurling Championship (3): 1982, 1998, 2007

=== Camogie (Ballyroe) ===
- Kildare Senior Camogie Championship: (4) 1961, 1962, 1963, 1964
- Kildare Senior Camogie League (2) 1960, 1961

== Bibliography ==
- Corry, Eoghan (1984). Kildare GAA: A Centenary History. CLG Chill Dara. (ISBN 978-0-9509370-0-7 hb ISBN 978-0-9509370-1-4 pb)
- Kildare GAA yearbook, 1972, 1974, 1978, 1979, 1980 and 2000.
- O'Flynn, Joan. Soaring Sliothars: Centenary of Kildare Camogie 1904–2004. Kildare County Camogie Board.
