= Round Towers GAA (Kildare) =

Gaelic games club in County Kildare, Ireland

Round Towers
- Na Cloigtithe
- Founded: 1880
- County: Kildare
- Nickname: Towers
- Colours: Black and Amber
- Grounds: St Brigid's Park, Kildare
- Coordinates: 53°09′40″N 6°54′51″W

Playing kits
Standard colours

Senior Club Championships
| | All Ireland | Leinster champions | Kildare champions |
|---|---|---|---|
| Football: | 10 | 0 | 0 |

Round Towers GAA is a Gaelic Athletic Association (GAA) club based in the town of Kildare, County Kildare, Ireland. The club has won 10 Kildare county senior football championships, six as Round Towers, three as Kildare and one as St Patrick's.

== History ==
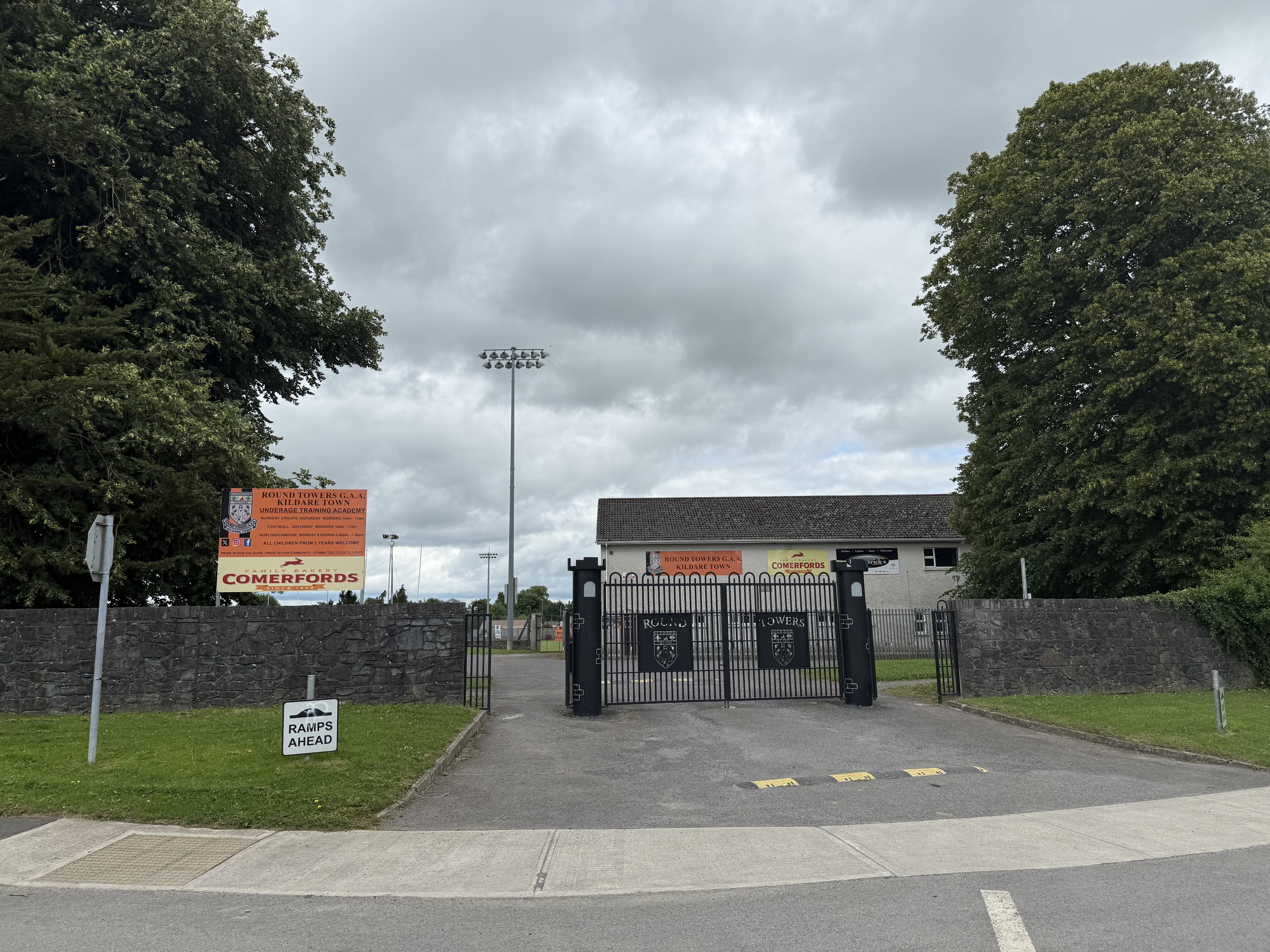
Round Towers GAA

Round Towers' most recent Senior Football Championship wins came in 1996 defeating Johnstownbridge, in 1998 defeating Clane and in 2003 defeating Kilcock. Round Towers were relegated to Intermediate Football in 2012 after a defeat by one point to St Kevin's in the relegation play-off. Managed by Glenn Ryan, they won the Intermediate Championship in 2016 with a one-point victory over Two Mile House in a replay.

== Notable persons ==
Glenn Ryan featured on the Kildare Football Team of the Millennium and was an All-Star winner in 1997 and 1998. Karl O'Dwyer (son of Kerry's Mick O'Dwyer) and Brian Lacey were All-Stars winners in 1998, and former Wexford hurler and 1989 All-Star Éamonn Cleary played for the team in the 1990s. Referee Seamus Aldridge played for the club.

A separate club, Naomh Bríd or St Brigid's organises hurling in the town. Three Naomh Bríd players, Tommy Burke, Jack O'Connell, and Pat White were chosen on the Kildare hurling team of the millennium. The Fitzpatrick family founded another club, Mooretown, in the district – its only honor was the Junior C Championship of 1982.

== Honors ==
- Kildare Senior Football Championship: Winners (10) 1927, 1929, 1930, 1938, 1954, 1959, 1961, 1996, 1998, 2003

== Bibliography ==
- Kildare GAA: A Centenary History, by Eoghan Corry, CLG Chill Dara, 1984, ISBN 0-9509370-0-2 hb ISBN 0-9509370-1-0 pb
- Kildare GAA yearbook, 1972, 1974, 1978, 1979, 1980 and 2000– in sequence especially the Millennium yearbook of 2000
- Soaring Sliothars: Centenary of Kildare Camogie 1904–2004 by Joan O'Flynn Kildare County Camogie Board.
