= Sarsfields GAA (Newbridge) =

Gaelic sports club in County Kildare, Ireland

Sarsfields
- Na Sairséalaigh
- Founded: 1897
- County: Kildare
- Nickname: The Sash
- Colours: Green and White
- Grounds: Sarsfields GAA Grounds, Rickardstown
- Coordinates: 53°11′19″N 6°48′48″W

Playing kits
Standard colours

Senior Club Championships
	All Ireland	Leinster champions	Kildare champions
Football:	0	0	25
Hurling:	0	0	0

Sarsfields is a Gaelic Athletic Association club based in Newbridge in County Kildare, Ireland. The club name is linked to Patrick Sarsfield's castle in the area and the club's colours are green with a white sash. Sarsfields has won 25 Kildare Senior Football Championships, more than any other club in the competition.

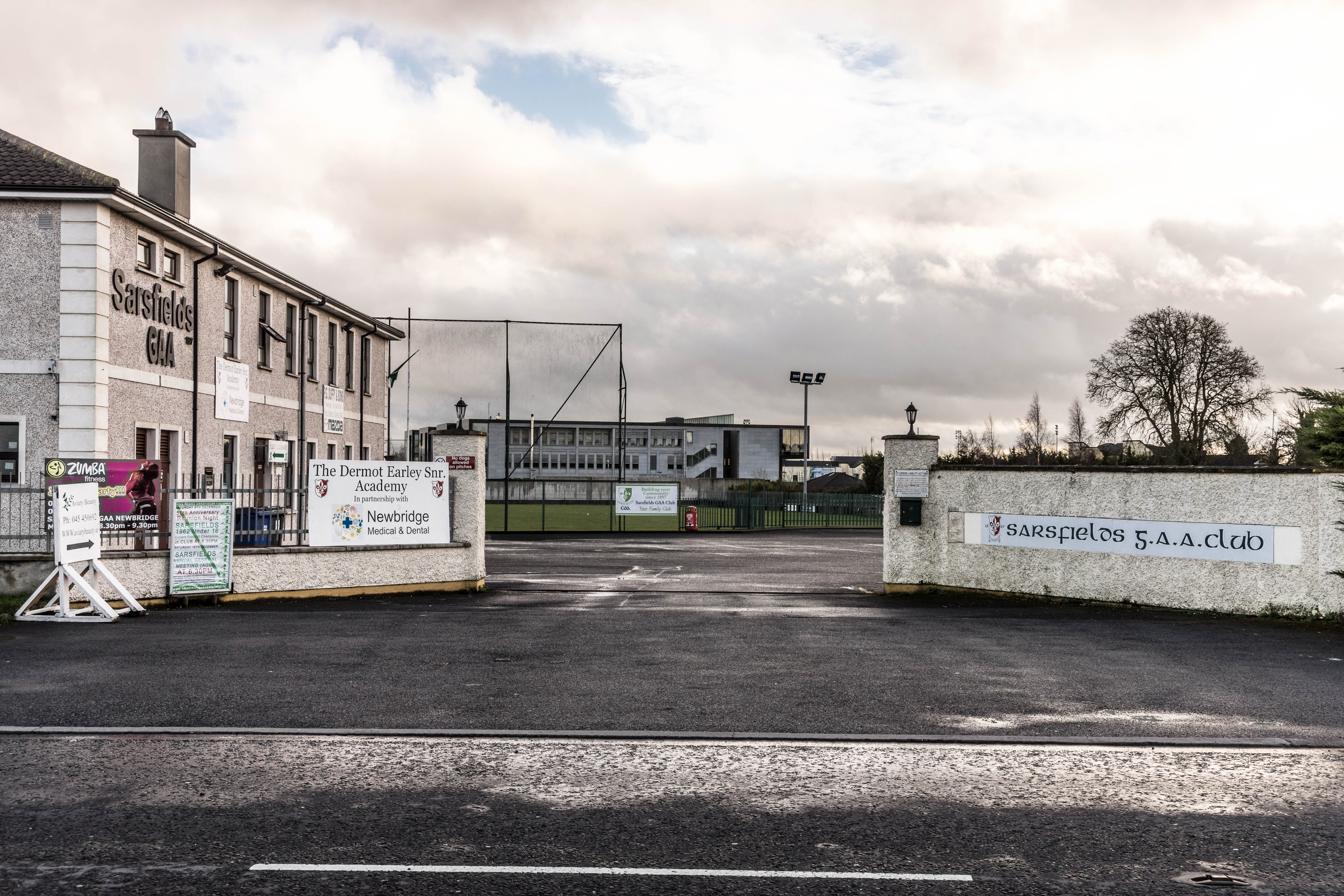
Entrance to grounds

== Football ==
The club was founded in 1897. Originally known as "Roseberry" or "Roseberry Sarsfields", and with its headquarters in the Roseberry area, it was registered as "Sons of Sarsfield Gaelic Football Club". A green jersey, with a white sash, were the chosen club colours. They are thus nicknamed, "The Sash."

Roseberry Sarsfields won its first championship title in 1904, beating Naas in a delayed final which was played in January 1905. Sarsfields combined with Clane to represent Kildare in the 1905 All-Ireland Senior Football Championship, and went on to win the 1905 final. Sarsfields would dominate Kildare football for the coming decade, with only a Monasterevin intervention in 1911 preventing the club winning nine titles in a row. The club subsequently won championships in 1945 and 1947 and also a "three-in-a-row" between 1950 and 1952.

Sarsfields waited thirty years for their next championship win when the 1982 team defeated St. Lawrences. Four years later, in 1986, Sarsfields won both minor and senior titles.

The club also won the All Ireland sevens in 1983 and 1984. In 1983, they defeated Scotstown of Monaghan in the final on a score line of 1-21 to 2-15. In the all-Kildare final of 1984, Sarsfields defeated Johnstown Bridge, winning by 4-15 to 2-8.

Sarfields also won in 1993 and the 1993 minor and under 21 titles were also secured. The Dermot Bourke Cup was retained in 1994.

In 1999, another championship was won. Sarsfields reached its first Leinster final, but lost to Dublin's Na Fianna. The club's twentieth title was captured in 2001. While Na Fianna of Dublin defeated the club in the Leinster semi-final, they used six substitutes, one more than allowed. Though the penalty was forfeiture of the game, Sarsfields offered to replay it. In a close game, Sarsfields were beaten in extra time with the last kick of the game.

2005 saw the club win the minor and senior championships. Sarsfields reached their second Leinster Final, losing out to Kilmacud Crokes.

In 2006, the seniors ended up in a championship relegation battle with Maynooth. In 2007, the Minor and U21 championships were captured. Between 2008 and 2009, three consecutive Junior league finals were contested, and two wins recorded. The Junior championship was won in 2009, allowing Sarsfields to compete at Intermediate level, for the first time in more than 20 years, from 2010.

The senior footballers contested but lost out in the 2010 county final. However the senior B team won the championship for the third year in a row. In addition, the junior C team captured the championship for the second year in a row.

In 2012, a senior championship football title was won against Carbury. In addition, the senior team captured the league title and won the Aldridge cup.

The Senior championship finals were lost in 2013 and 2014 but regained in 2015 and 2016. Another title was added in 2019 after a replay with neighbours Moorefield which ended Moorefield's hopes of 3-in-a-row. Sarsfields again reached the county final in 2021, this time losing to Naas. Sarsfields won the title again for the 26th time in 2026 win a win over Maynooth.

== Hurling ==
After a number of years without a hurling team Sarsfields re-entered the junior league in 2007 and in June 2007 were crowned League champions after defeating Athy by 5–8 to 2–6. Sarsfields Hurling were 2009 Junior League and Championship double winners and now compete at Intermediate level.

== Ladies football ==
Sarsfields were Kildare junior champions in 2003 and intermediate champions in 2004. They also won the Leinster Intermediate Championship in 2004. They beat Moorefield in the minor Championship in 2008. The club's Ladies football team again won the intermediate championship in 2014 and the first ever senior title in 2015.

== Honours ==
- Kildare Senior Football Championship (25): 1904, 1905, 1906, 1907, 1908, 1909, 1910, 1912, 1915 1945, 1947, 1950, 1951, 1952, 1982, 1986, 1993, 1994, 1999, 2001, 2005, 2012, 2015, 2016, 2019
- Kildare Senior Football League Division 1 (14): 1945, 1946, 1947, 1952, 1954, 1981, 1983, 1984, 1986, 1988, 1989, 1992, 2007, 2012
- Kildare Senior Football League Division 2 (1): 2000
- Kildare Junior Football Championship (2): 1924, 1933.
- Kildare U-21 Football Championship (5): 1987, 1992, 1993, 2007, 2013, 2017
- Kildare Minor Football Championship (14): 1940, 1941, 1957, 1958, 1968, 1969, 1970, 1986, 1990, 1993, 1996, 2005, 2007, 2014
- Kildare Senior B Championship (9): 1994, 2005, 2008, 2009, 2010, 2015, 2017, 2019, 2020, 2021
- Jack Higgins Cup (4): 1985, 1994, 2009, 2015
- Kildare Junior Hurling Championship (1): 2009
- Kildare Intermediate B Hurling Championship (1): 2010

== Notable people ==
Notable people, associated with the club, include:

- Davy Burke, who managed the club prior to taking-up a role with Wicklow GAA
- Dermot Earley Jnr, an All Star winner in 1998 and 2009.
- Dermot Earley Snr, who won the championship with Sarsfields in 1982 and 1986.
