= R415 road (Ireland) =

Road in Ireland

R415 road
- Bóthar R415
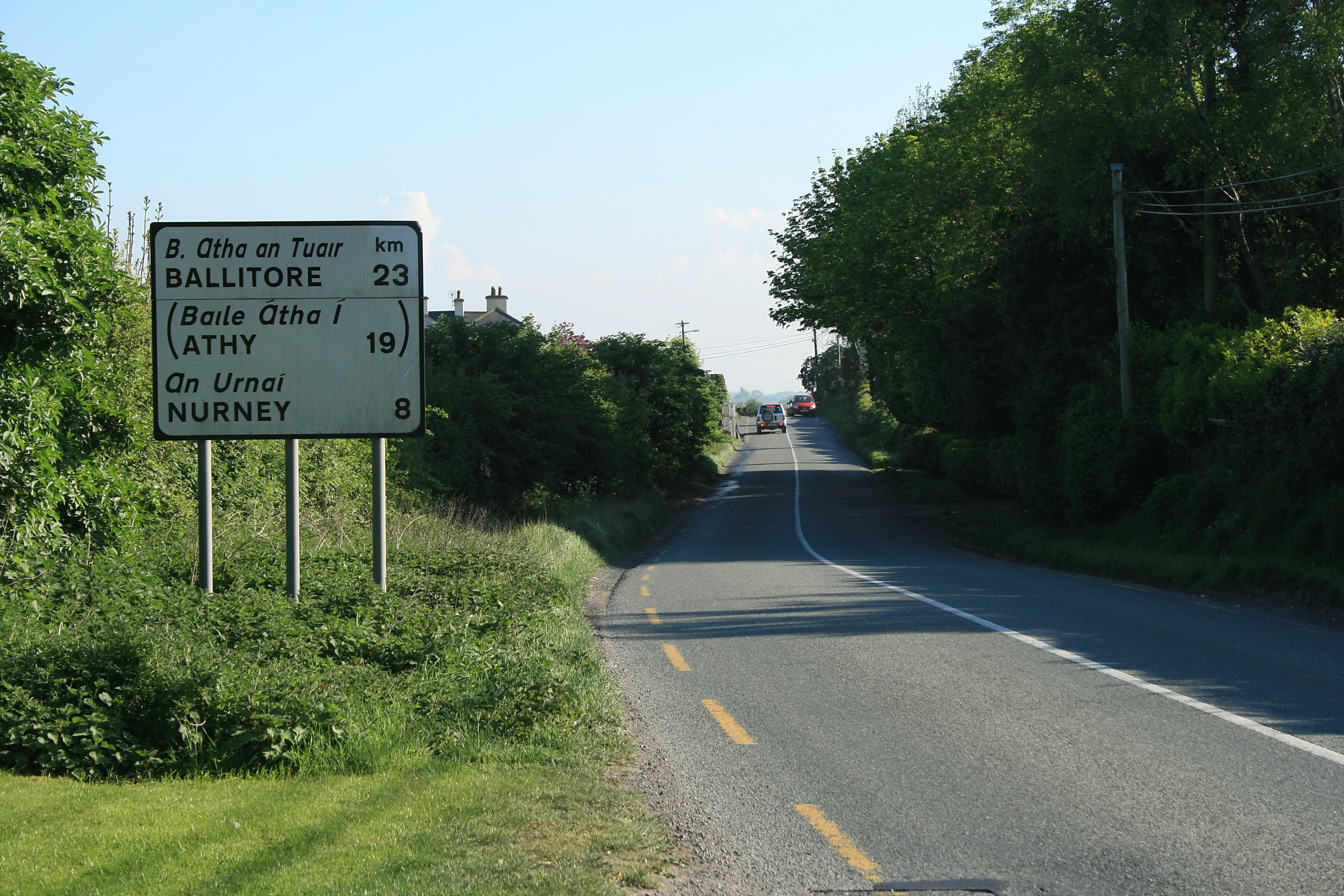
- The R415 road, south of Kildare town

Route information
- Length: 39.3 km (24.4 mi)

Location
- Country: Ireland
- Primary destinations: County Kildare; Allenwood leave R403; Crosses the Grand Canal; Crosses the Grand Canal (Barrow Line); Crosses the Grand Canal (Old Barrow Line); Kilmeague; Allen; Passes the Hill of Allen; Milltown – (R416) – Crosses the Grand Canal (Milltown Feeder); Kildare – Crosses the Dublin-Cork railway line ; (R403); (R413); (R401); (R445); crosses the M7 at J13; Nurney; N78; Passes over the M9; Crookstown terminates at the R448

Highway system
- Roads in Ireland; Motorways; Primary; Secondary; Regional

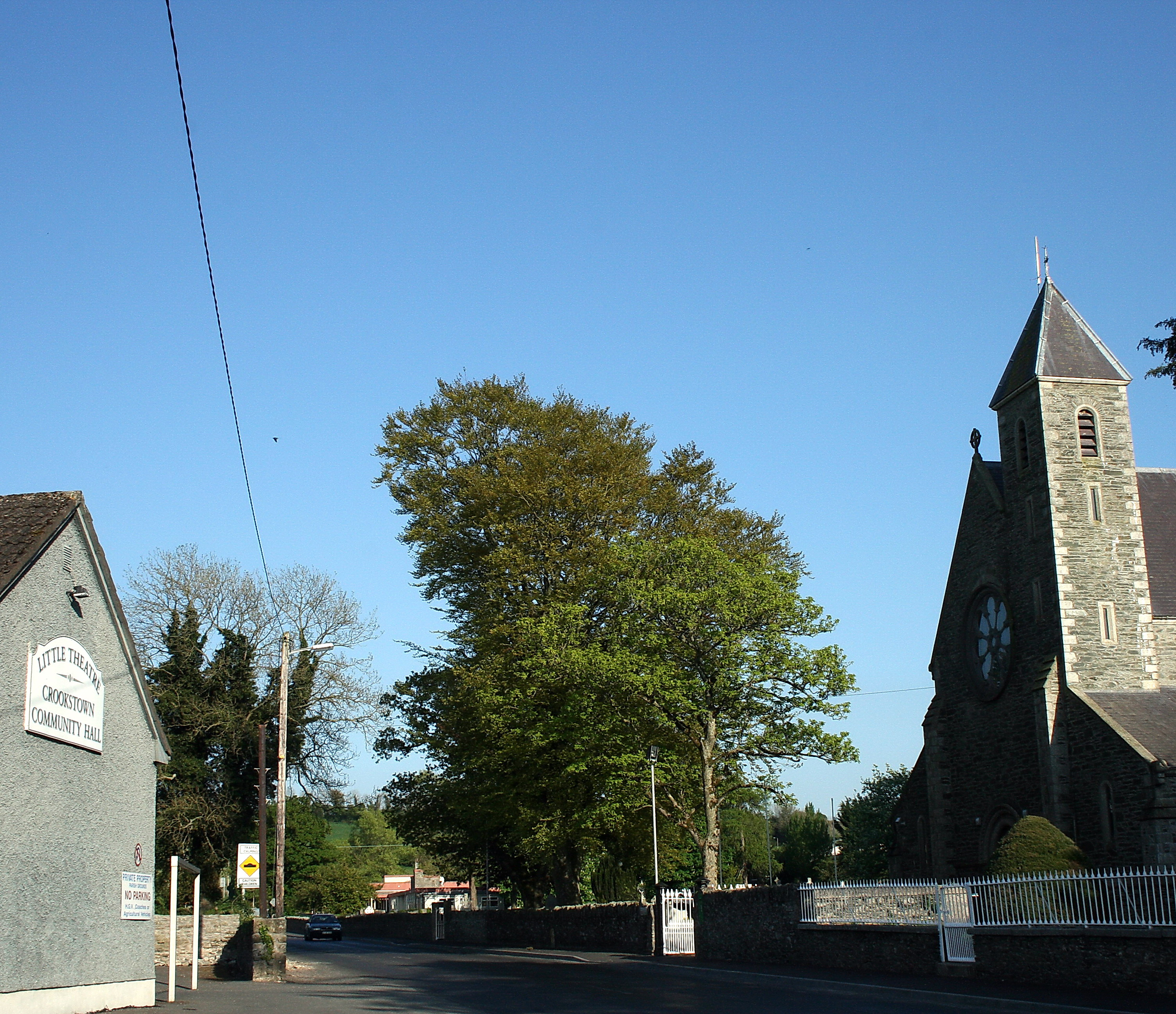
Crookstown, Ballitore, at the end of the R415

The R415 road is a regional road in Ireland, which runs north-south from its junction with the R403 in Allenwood to the R448 (formerly the N9) at Crookstown, passing through Kildare town, and crossing the R418 between Kilcullen and Athy. The route is entirely within County Kildare.

The route is 39.3 km (24.4 mi) long.

== Route ==
The official description of the R415 from the Roads Act 1993 (Classification of Regional Roads) Order 2012 reads:

R415: Allenwood Cross — Kildare — Crookstown Upper, County Kildare

Between its junction with R403 at Allenwood Cross and its junction with R445 at Dublin Street in the town of Kildare via Derrymullen, Kilmeage, Allen Cross, Milltown, Rathbride Cross, Little Curragh, Whitesland East; Station Road and Market Square in the town of Kildare all in the county of Kildare (map of this 16.8 km segment)

and

between its junction with R445 at Claregate Street in the town of Kildare and its junction with R418 at Fontstown Lower via Modus Media Road in the town of Kildare; Greyabbey, Newtown Cross, Kingsbog, Nurney, Mylerstown Cross and Boley Cross roads all in the county of Kildare (map of this 14.6 km segment)

and

between its junction with the R418 at Fontstown Upper and its junction with R448 at Crookstown Upper via Ballyadams Cross, Boleybeg and Crookstown Lower all in the county of Kildare map of this 7.9 km segment).

== See also ==
- Roads in Ireland
- National primary road
- National secondary road
