= Joe McTeague =

Irish Gaelic footballer

Personal information
- Native name: Seosamh Mac Taidhg (Irish)
- Born: 1946 Kilmeage, County Kildare, Ireland
- Occupation: Carpenter
- Height: 5 ft 11 in (180 cm)

Sport
- Sport: Gaelic football
- Position: Left corner-back
Club
- Years: Club
- Ballyteague
Club titles
- Kildare titles: 0
Inter-county
- Years: County
- 1965–1976: Kildare
Inter-county titles
- Leinster titles: 0
- All-Irelands: 0
- NFL: 0
- All Stars: 0

Joseph McTeague (born 1946) is an Irish former Gaelic footballer. At club level, he played with Ballyteague and he was also a member of the Kildare senior football team.

== Career ==
McTeague had his first success at club level in 1964 when he won a Kildare MFC title with St Mary's. He later progressed to adult level with Ballyteague and won a Kildare JAFC medal in 1972 followed by a Kildare IFC medal in 1973. McTeague also lined out when Ballyteague were beaten by Carbury in the Kildare SFC final in 1974.

At inter-county level, McTeague was part of the Kildare team that won consecutive Leinster U21FC titles as well as the All-Ireland U21FC title in 1965. He later spent a decade with the senior team but lost four leinster SFC finals between 1966 and 1976.

== Honours ==
St Mary's

- Kildare Minor Football Championship: 1964

Ballyteague

- Kildare Intermediate Football Championship: 1973
- Kildare Junior A Football Championship: 1972

Kildare

- All-Ireland Under-21 Football Championship: 1965
- Leinster Under-21 Football Championship: 1965, 1966
