= Milltown, County Kildare =

Milltown Baile an Mhuilinn (Irish)
- Village
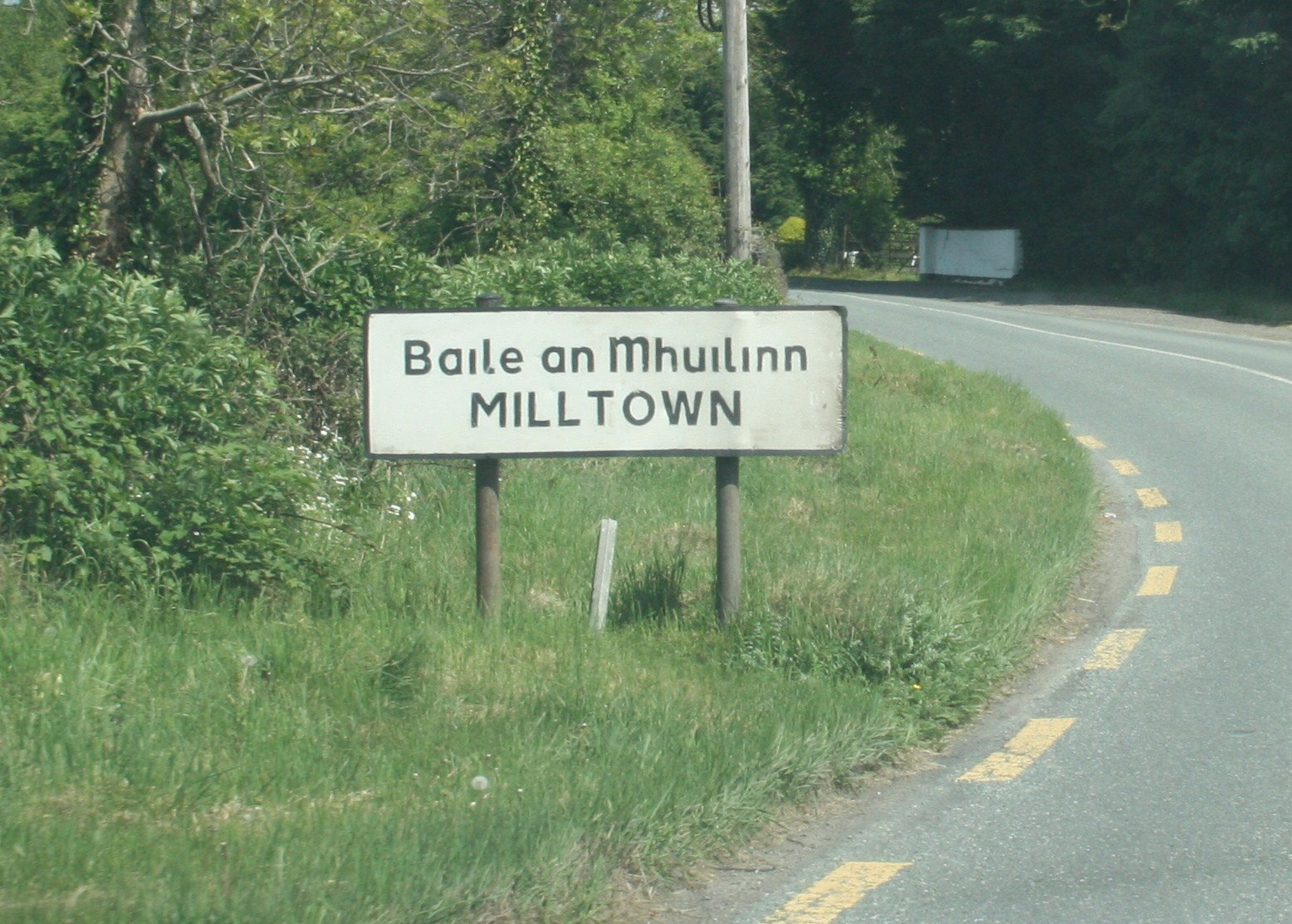

- Location in Ireland
- Coordinates: 53°12′18″N 6°51′39″W
- Country: Ireland
- Province: Leinster
- County: County Kildare

Population (2022)
  - Total: 372
- Time zone: UTC+0 (WET)
  - Summer (DST): UTC-1 (IST (WEST))

Milltown (Irish: Baile an Mhuilinn, meaning "town of the mill") is a village in County Kildare, Ireland. The village is in the townland of the same name in the civil parish of Feighcullen It is 7 km from the town of Newbridge. It is on the R415 regional road between Allenwood and Crookstown.

== Demographics ==
In the 2002 census, the village had a population of 271, by 2006 this had shrunk by 10.7% to 242. At the 2022 census, the population of Milltown village was 372.

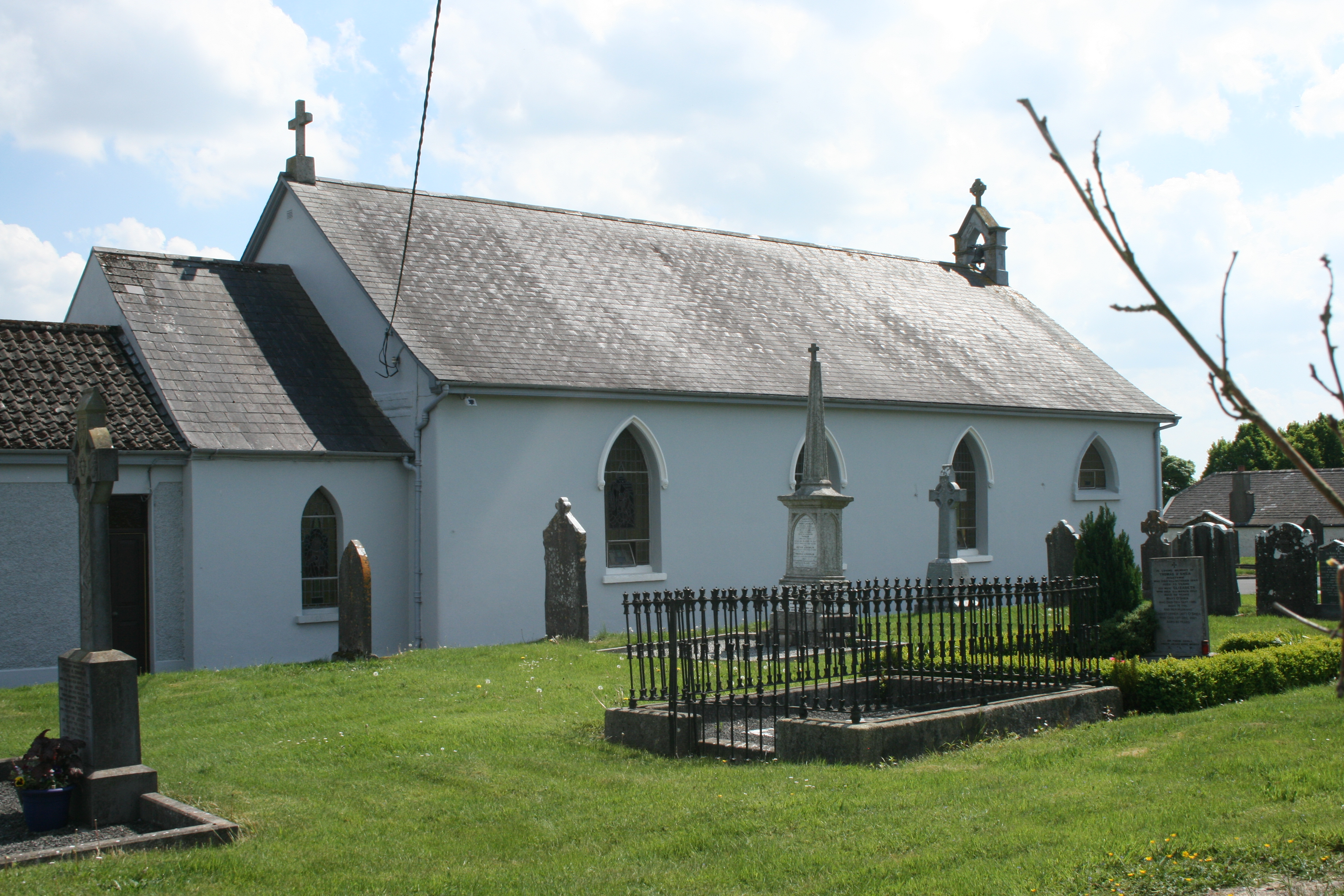
The Church of St Brigid

== Churches ==
Milltown is part of the Allen Parish. The Church of St Brigid is located in Milltown. The present Church of St Brigid was built in 1817. An inserted tablet records -A Chapel of ease was erected here in 1817 by Rev. John Lawler P.P. and the subscription of the faithful. It was renovated and reroofed in 1961. The Rev. John Lawlor who erected the Church, was Parish Priest of Allen 1802 to 1830. He was a native of Morristown in the parish of Monasterevan. A portion of the east gable of an older chapel of the penal times still stands near the modern church. An even older church at Milltown or Ballymuillen is mentioned again in Dr McGeoghegan's list of churches. The Church of St Brigid underwent major renovation in 2007/08.

== Notable people ==
- Moll Anthony is buried in the graveyard.
- Damien Leith, singer-songwriter, raised in Milltown

== Sport ==
Milltown is home to Milltown GAA, which was founded in 1888. They have also won a junior championship in Leinster in 2023.

== Gallery ==
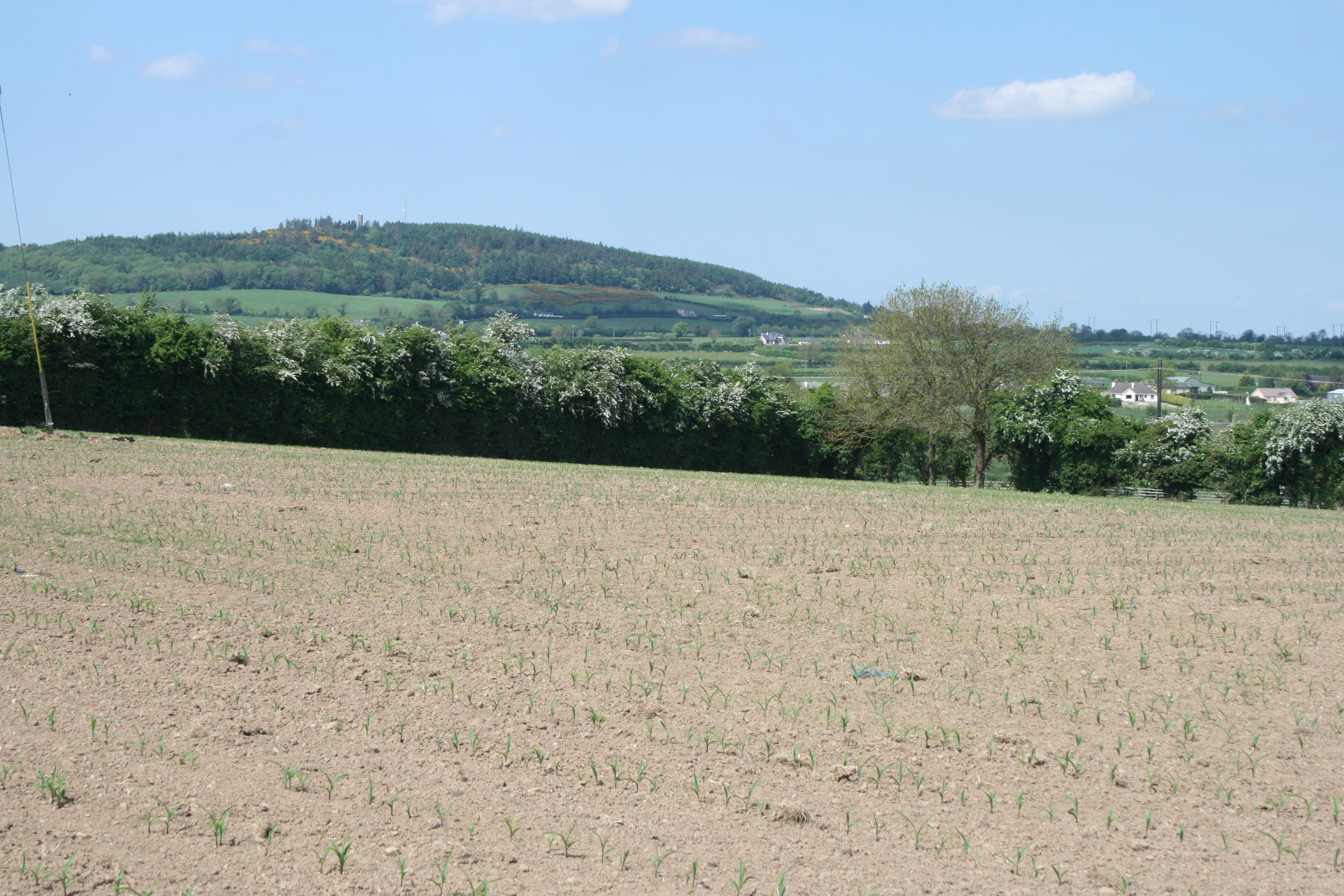
A field in Milltown with the Hill of Allen in the distance.

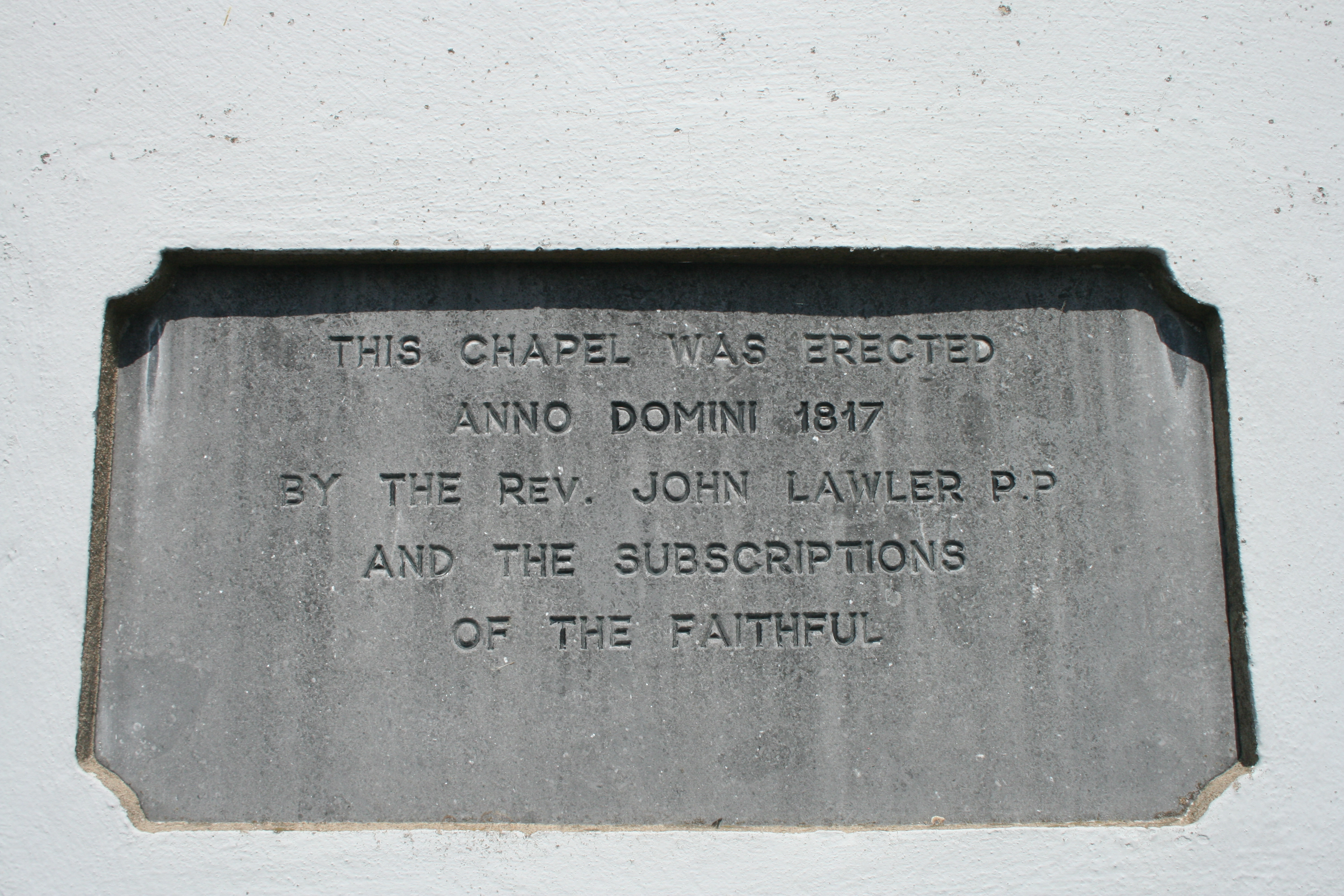
A Memorial Plaque on The Church of St.Brigid.

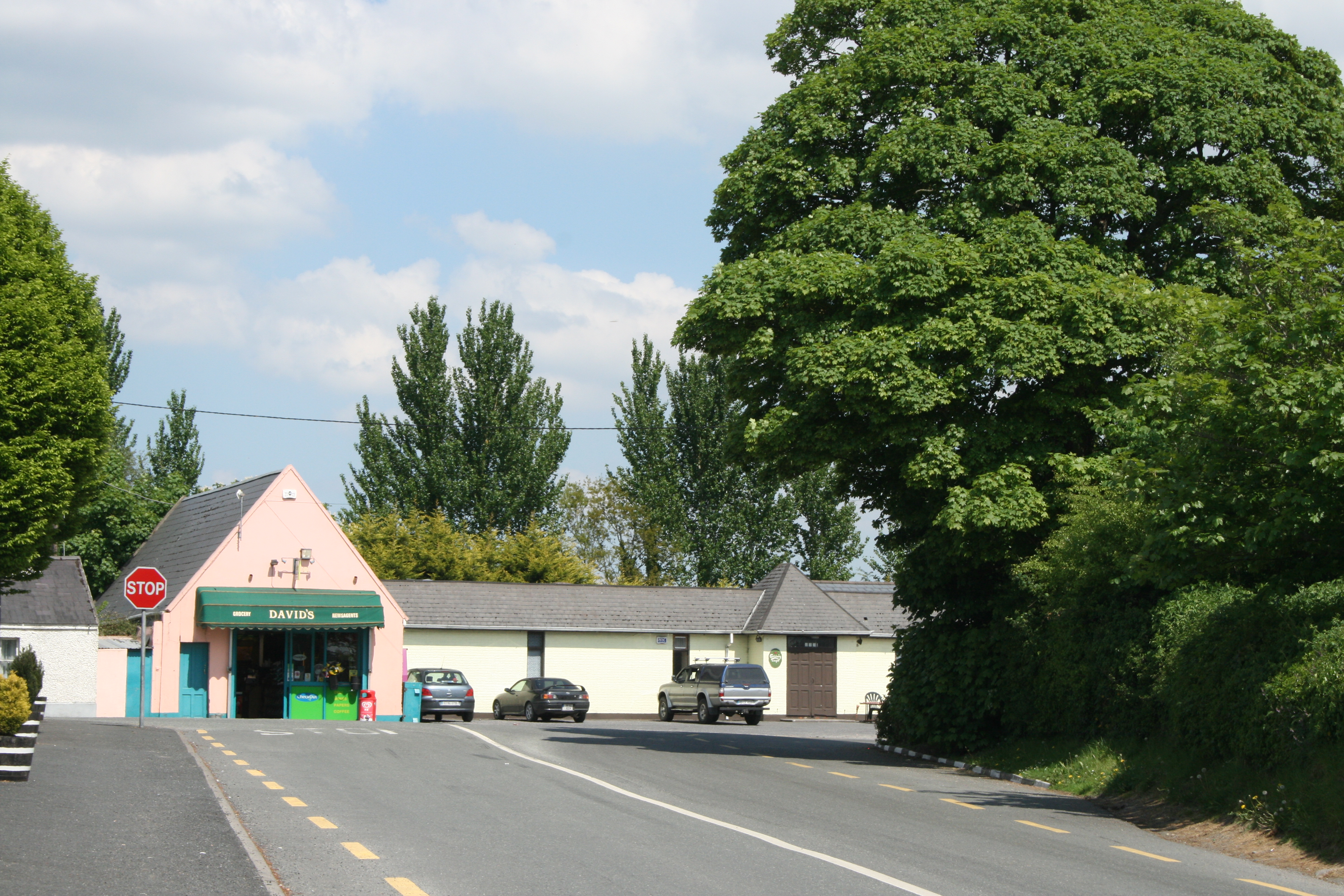
Milltown.

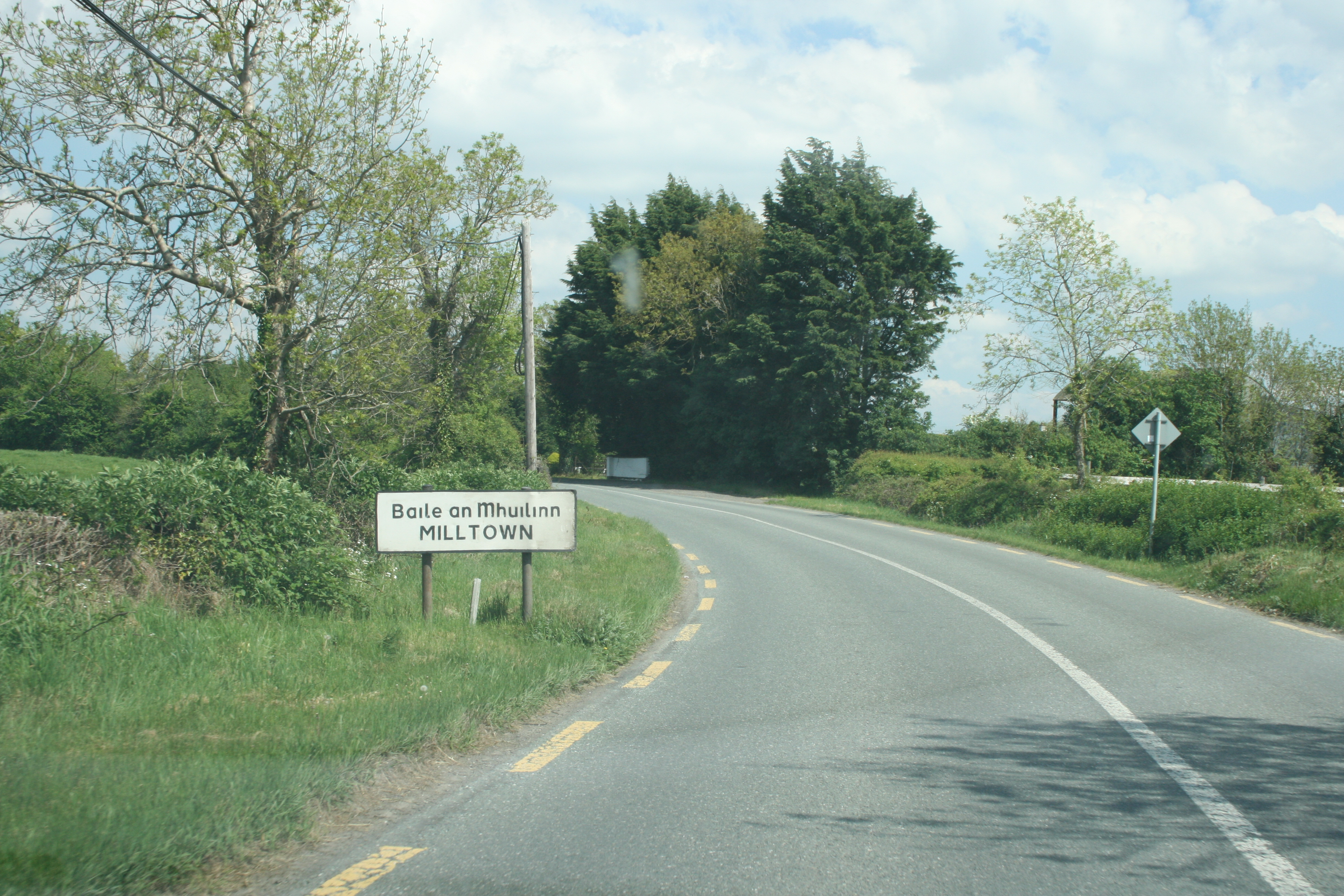
Milltown Countryside
