= R416 road (Ireland) =

Road in County Kildare, Ireland

Coordinates: 53.196185°N 6.829954°W

R416 road
- Bóthar R416
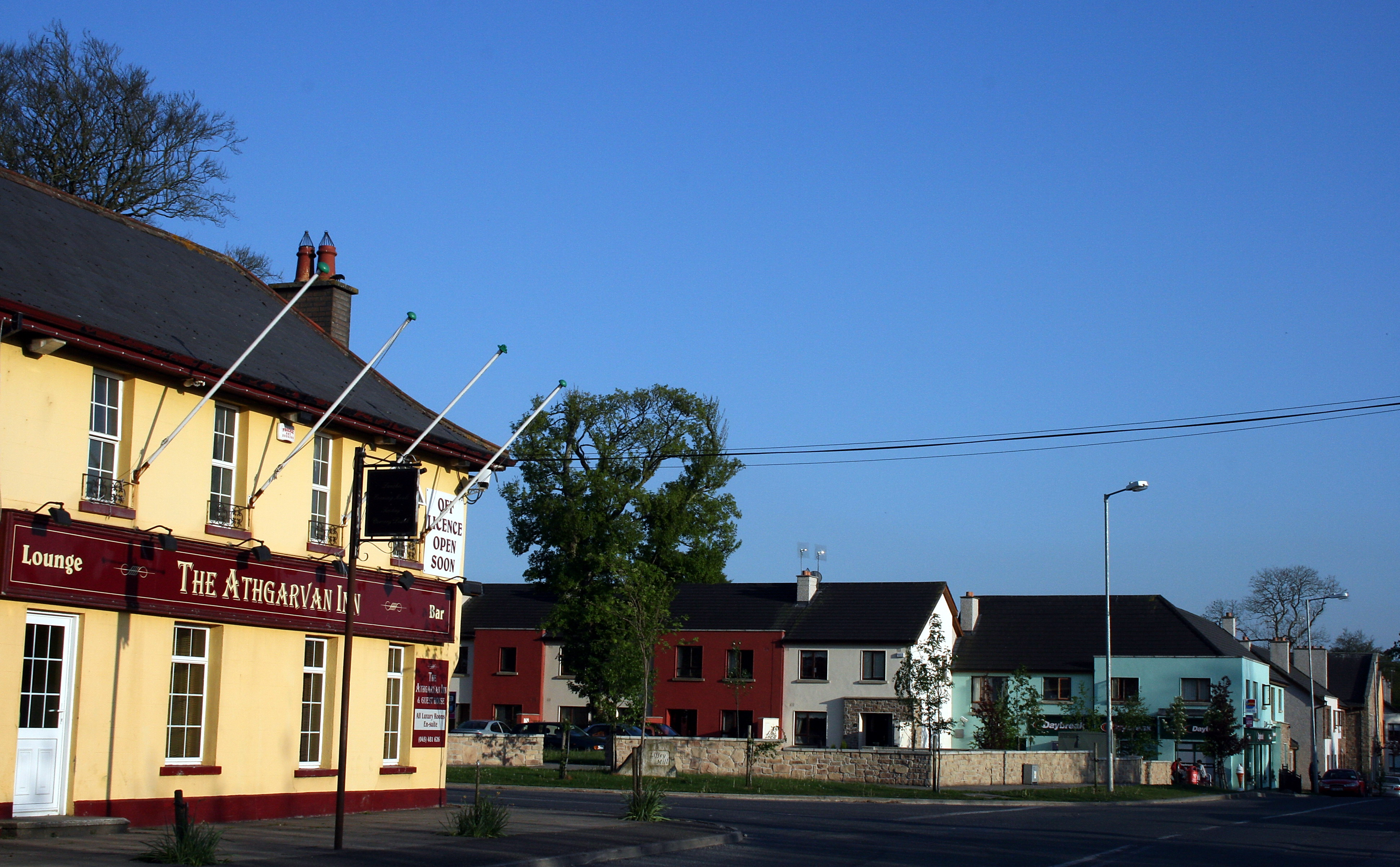
- R416 passing the Athgarvan Inn

Route information
- Length: 9.1 km (5.7 mi)

Major junctions
- From: R415 Milltown
- R445 Newbridge; Passes through Athgarvan
- To: R413 Kinneagh Crossroads

Location
- Country: Ireland

Highway system
- Roads in Ireland; Motorways; Primary; Secondary; Regional

The R416 road, also called the Milltown Road or Athgarvan Road, is a regional road in Ireland, located in County Kildare.
