= Nuadha hua Lomthuile =

Irish poet

Nuadha hua Lomthuile, Irish poet, fl. 721.

Nuada was one of two poets who wrote verse on the battle of Almuine.

Do dith laithe Almuine
ac cosnum buaír Bregmuighe,
ro láe badb belderg birach
ilach im chend Fergaile.
Buaidh ard Almuine ni fan,
adguidhi dal do gach duil,
im secht milib, dermar dal
Fergal mar mac Maile Duin.
At-bath cét ruirech rathach
cu cét costadhach carnach.
im secht n-gelta cen mine,
im secht mile fer n-armach.

== See also ==
- Cu Bretan mac Conghusa
