= Ballyteague GFC =

Gaelic football club in County Kildare, Ireland

Ballyteague
- Baile Thaigh
- Founded: 1927
- County: Kildare
- Nickname: The Larks
- Colours: Green and Gold
- Grounds: Ballyteague GAA grounds, Ballyteige North, Kilmeage
- Coordinates: 53.26622°N 6.86551°W

Playing kits
Standard colours

Ballyteague GFC is a Gaelic football club in Kilmeage, County Kildare, Ireland, club of the year in 1980, winners of junior, and intermediate in successive years 1972-1973 and senior finalists in 1974.

== History ==
RIC records from 1890 show that Boherkill and Kilmoney club had 50 members with officers listed as Edward Delaney, Edward Loughlin, and John Flynn senior and junior listed as officers. Ballyteague affiliated 1927–51, founded by Mick Behan, Paddy Nugent and Jack Gilligan while Dinny Dunny, father of Pat, was one of the original players. The original colours were vertical stripes of red and green.

== Gaelic football ==
After re-affiliating in 1951, Ballyteague won Junior B in 1962. Joe McTeague, Seamus Brennan, Michael Nugent, John Jacob and later Tommy Herbert spearheaded their Towers and they then eliminated Clane and played a memorable three-game semi-final saga against area side St. Wolstan's. At half time in the 1974 county final they were 0-5 to 0-1 ahead against Carbury, but failed to score in the second half and lost 2-9 to 0–5. When they were promoted to senior again after 1991 they beat Sarsfields and Round Towers in the championship. The club stages the Herbert Cup tournament.

== Honours ==
- Kildare Senior Football Championship Finalists 1974
- Kildare Intermediate Football Championship: 1973, 1991, 2022
- Kildare Junior A Football Championship 1972, 1988
- Kildare Junior B Football Championship: (1) 1972
- Kildare Intermediate Football League: (1) 1967
- Kildare Football League Division 2: (1) 1972
- Kildare Football League Division 3: Winners (3) 2002, 2015, 2018
- Kildare Junior Football League: (2) 1928, 1979
- Kildare Minor Football League: (1) 1981
- Kildare Intermediate B Football Championship: (2) 2005, 2007

== Bibliography ==
- Kildare GAA: A Centenary History, by Eoghan Corry, CLG Chill Dara, 1984, ISBN 0-9509370-0-2 hb ISBN 0-9509370-1-0 pb
- Kildare GAA yearbook, 1972, 1974, 1978, 1979, 1980 and 2000- in sequence especially the Millennium yearbook of 2000
- Soaring Sliothars: Centenary of Kildare Camogie 1904-2004 by Joan O'Flynn Kildare County Camogie Board.
