= R413 road (Ireland) =

Road in Ireland

R413 road
- Bóthar R413
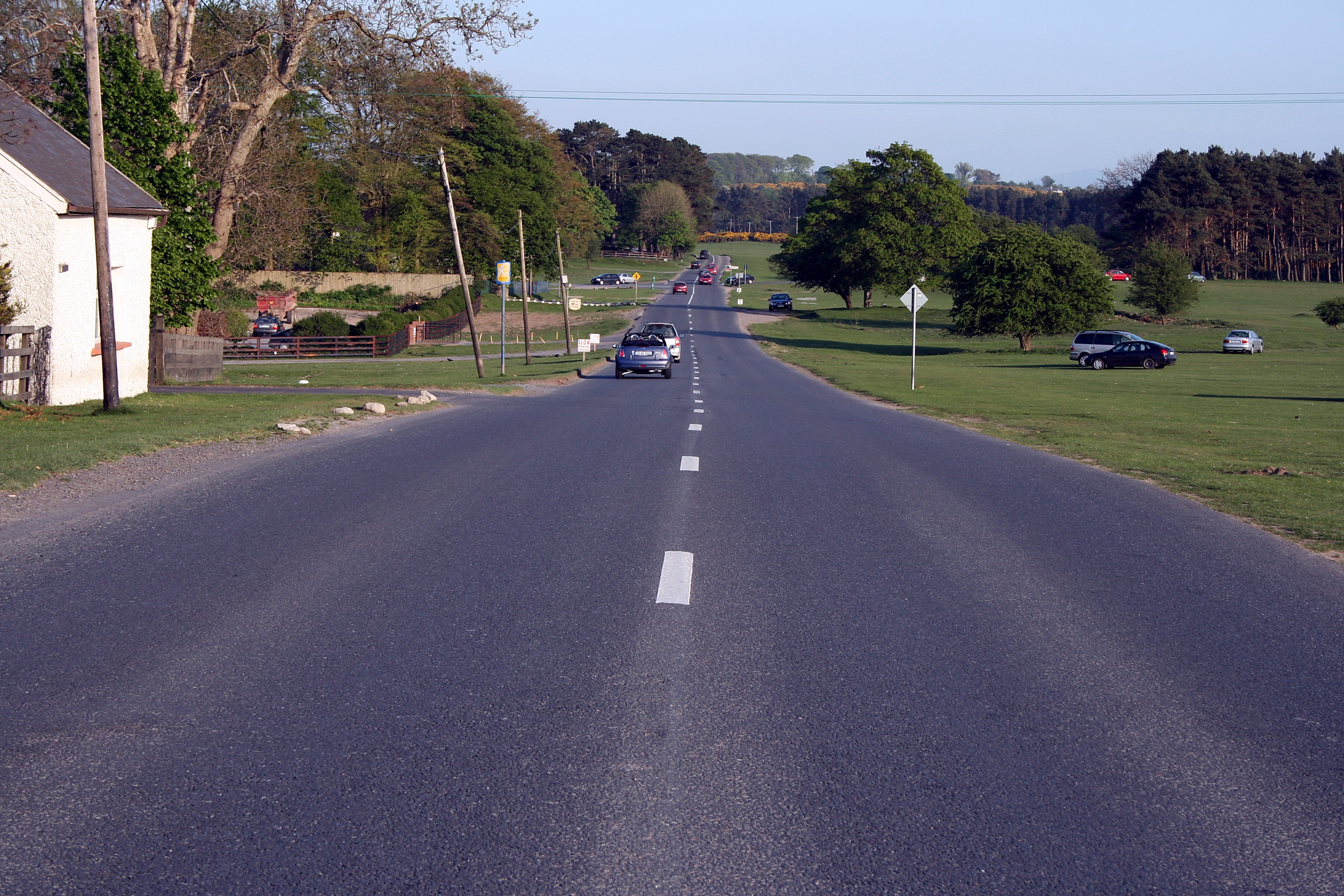
- The R413 in the Curragh

Route information
- Length: 23 km (14 mi)

Location
- Country: Ireland
- Primary destinations: County Kildare; Kildare start at the Market Square which joins the R401, R445, and R415; The Curragh; follows the Dublin-Cork railway line along the northern edge of Curragh Racecourse; M7 motorway – crosses the M7 at Junction 12 where it also meets the R445; (R416); Passes under the M9 motorway; Kilcullen – (R448); crosses the River Liffey; Brannockstown – joins/leaves the R412; Ballymore Eustace – terminates at junction with the R411

Highway system
- Roads in Ireland; Motorways; Primary; Secondary; Regional

The R413 road is a regional road in Ireland, which runs west-east from Kildare to Ballymore Eustace, all in County Kildare. En route, it skirts, and largely demarcates, 10 km (6.2 mi) of the northern edge of the Curragh.

The route is 23 km (14 mi) long.

== Route ==
The official description of the R413 from the Roads Act 1993 (Classification of Regional Roads) Order 2012 reads:

R413: Kildare — Kilcullen — Barrymore Eustace, County Kildare

Between its junction with R415 at Station Road in the town of Kildare and its junction with R412 at Brannockstown via Melitta Road in the town of Kildare; Curragh, Ballymany Cross, Curragh, Kinneagh Cross, Castlemartin, Kilcullen and Newabbey all in the county of Kildare (map of this 17.6 km segment)

and

between its junction with R412 at Brannockstown and its junction with R411 at Main Street Ballymore Eustace via Ardinode West all in the county of Kildare (map of this 5.4 km segment).

== See also ==
- Roads in Ireland
- National primary road
- National secondary road
