= Cupidstown Hill =

Hill in County Kildare, Ireland

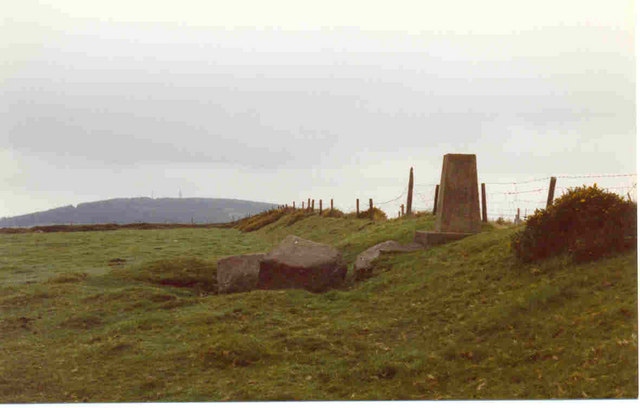
- Cupidstown Hill, looking north-east towards Saggart Hill

Highest point
- Elevation: 379 m (1,243 ft)
- Prominence: 54 m (177 ft)
- Listing: County top (Kildare)
- Coordinates: 53°13′33.57″N 6°29′32.84″W

Naming
- Native name: Cnoc Bhaile Cupid
- English translation: Hill of Cupidstown

Geography
- Location within Ireland
- Location: County Kildare, Ireland
- Parent range: Wicklow Mountains
- Topo map: OSi Discovery 50

Cupidstown Hill (from Irish Cnoc Bhaile Cupid 'hill of Cupidstown'), at 379 metres (1,243 ft), is the highest point in County Kildare, Ireland, and lies on the fringes of the Wicklow Mountains, 11.6 kilometres (7.2 mi) east of Naas.

== Naming ==
The origin of the name is uncertain; "Cupid" may have originally been Cuthbert, Cudlipp or coppis.

== Geography ==
At 379 metres it is the highest summit in Kildare, almost twice as high as the Hill of Allen. But Cupidstown Hill is lesser known than other summits in Kildare as it is dwarfed by nearby mountains such as Kippure. It is just above the village of Kilteel, and is the 872nd highest summit in Ireland.

== See also ==
- Lists of mountains in Ireland
- List of Irish counties by highest point
- List of mountains of the British Isles by height
- List of Marilyns in the British Isles
