= Cu Bretan mac Conghusa =

Irish poet

Cu Bretan mac Conghusa, Irish poet, fl. 721.

Cu Bretan was one of two poets who wrote verse commemorating the Battle of Almhain.

At-aghur cath forderg flann,
a fir Fergaile, a deghlínd.
bronach muinter Muire de
iar m-breth a taige dia cínd.
Bó in chlaim
ro gáet inarradh in daim.
mairg laim ro gheoghain a brath
re techt a cath co mac m-Brain.
Ma beth neach do-bera cath
matain derbmain fri mac m-Brain,
andsa lium inas in drai
in cai ro chechtair in chlaim.

== See also ==
- Nuadha hua Lomthuile
- Áed Allán
