= Athgarvan =

Village in County Kildare, Ireland

Athgarvan Áth Garbháin
- Village
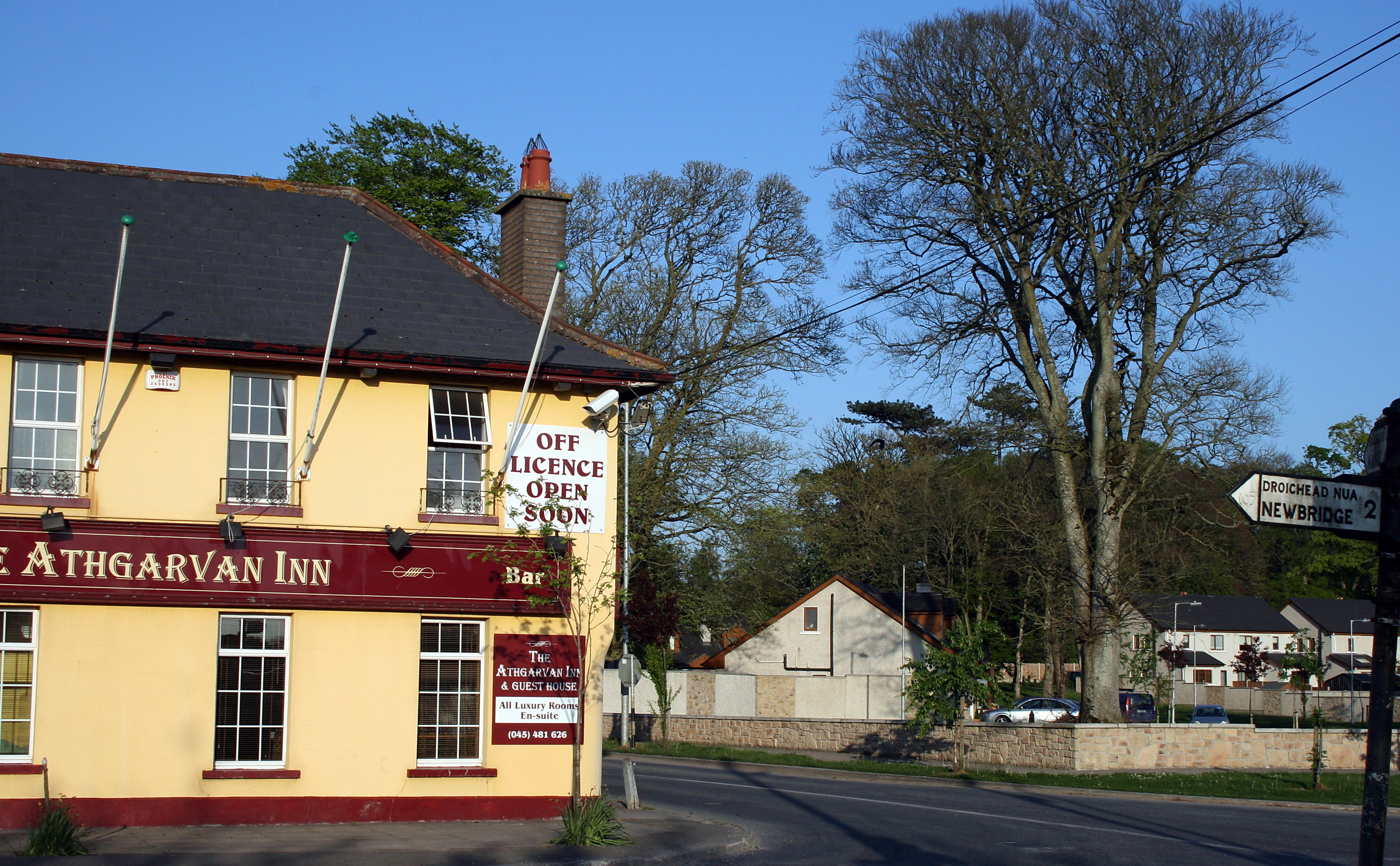

- Location in Ireland
- Coordinates: 53°09′11″N 6°46′41″W
- Country: Ireland
- County: County Kildare
- Elevation: 115 m (377 ft)

Population (2016)
  - Total: 1,176
- Irish Grid Reference: N817120

Athgarvan (Irish: Áth Garbháin, meaning 'Garvan's ford') is a village 4 km (2.5 mi) southwest of Newbridge in County Kildare, Ireland. The population of the village was 1,176 in the census of 2016.

== Location ==
Athgarvan lies on the R416 regional road. It sits just west of the River Liffey which forms the eastern boundary of the village, while The Curragh forms its western boundary.

The M7 motorway lies just beyond its northern boundary and separates it from Newbridge, which has now expanded as far south as the M7, with the result that the edges of the two settlements are now just one kilometre apart.

== Development ==
A development plan published by Kildare County Council in 2007 proposed that the village would expand towards the Curragh. The village itself has grown rapidly since the late 20th century, increasing in population from 322 people in 1994 to over 1,100 by 2016.

== Sport ==
The local Gaelic Athletic Association club is Athgarvan GAA. Newbridge Rugby Football Club is also nearby.

== See also ==
- List of towns and villages in Ireland
