= R411 road (Ireland) =

Road in Ireland

Coordinates: 53.158885°N 6.632021°W

R411 road
- Bóthar R411
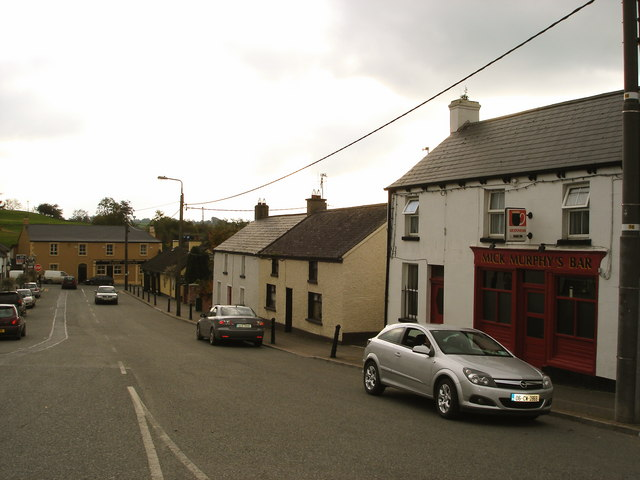
- Ballymore Eustace Main Street, part of the R411

Route information
- Length: 13.8 km (8.6 mi)

Major junctions
- From: R448 Naas
- Crosses River Liffey; R413 Ballymore Eustace; Enters County Wicklow
- To: N81 Hollywood

Location
- Country: Ireland

Highway system
- Roads in Ireland; Motorways; Primary; Secondary; Regional

The R411 road is a regional road in Ireland, located in County Kildare and County Wicklow. It runs between the town of Naas and the village of Hollywood, passing through Ballymore Eustace in doing so.>
