= Moll Anthony =

Irish "wise woman" (c. 1807 - 1878)

Moll Anthony, aka Mary Leeson (c. 1807–1878), was an Irish bean feasa (wise-woman) who lived at Hill of the Grange, but apparently originally from the Red Hills, County Kildare. She was called after her father, Anthony Dunne. She was buried in Milltown, County Kildare, in 1878.

Moll was able to cure both people and animals with potions she created from particular herbs. Each potion was given in three porter bottles, two of which she gave at her first visit, the third bottle been given at the second visit. The charge was half a crown a bottle. According to a website,

"There were strict rules applied to the giving, consuming and transportation of the potions, and if any of the rules weren't adhered to, the cure failed. A cure was never allowed to be tried twice. So strong was the power of the cure, that on bringing it home, the bearer was often hindered by some evil agent, who would try and stop them from reaching home. When the third and final doses were being given to the patient, some force would also try and stop this as well. However, if the doses were successfully administered, a cure was nearly always guaranteed."

== Folklore ==
Lord Walter Fitzgerald wrote of her

"Moll Anthony of the Red Hills had a supernatural power in curing paralysis, fits, strokes, and other sicknesses in humans and animals. It was said that she got the gift from the fairies. Sometimes, however, she would refuse to help a person, if she thought it best for the person to die, or if it was their second time to seek her help. Before asking for her help, she would welcome a complete stranger by addressing by their name and telling them their sickness. This passage concerns an account related to the author by 2 men who had received help from Moll.

He furthermore stated that "Some believed that Moll Anthony of the Red Hills was a sort of reincarnation of a young dead girl. And that Moll's spirit had been left by the fairies in replace of the young girls dead body in the coffin." His account was as follows:

"One day, the two sons of the Widow Anthony, who lived near Mullaghmast, met a funeral party on the road and so they helped to carry the coffin. Later on in the day they found the coffin abandoned on the road and so they brought it home to their mother. She opened it, to discover a young girl in it, warm as if asleep. She recovered and she grew up with the family for the next nine years. Then she married one of the sons; they had 3 children, and they all lived a happy life. Mary, as they called her, asked her husband one day to bring her to the fair in Castledermot and so he agreed. At the fair Mary was recognised by her parents, and it was discovered that the day of her funeral coincided with the day the sons of Widow Anthony found her. That was how Moll Anthony came to Mullaghmast."

Fitzgerald claimed that Moll Anthony's name was Mary Leeson, that she died in 1878 and that her cure passed on to a James Leeson her son. This man lived in a comfortable slated house on the Hill of the Grange on the site of Moll's former mud-walled house. Local people accept that James had the cure and the house which still clings to the side of Grange Hill was his.

== Tombstone ==
Two side-by-side tombstones in the graveyard of Milltown, County Kildare, read.

"Erected by Catherine Leeson of Grange Hill in loving memory of her dearly beloved husband, James Leeson who departed this life 27th April 1894, aged 64 years."

"Erected by Mary Leeson of Punchesgrange in memory of her mother, Eliza Cronley who departed this life 24th of April 1847 aged 70 years, also her daughter Eliza Leeson who departed this life 11th of December 1851 aged 20 years. Also the above named Mary Leeson who died 28th Nov. 1878 aged 71 years."

== See also ==
- Biddy Early
- Cunning folk in Britain
