= R412 road (Ireland) =

Road in Ireland

R412 road
- Bóthar R412
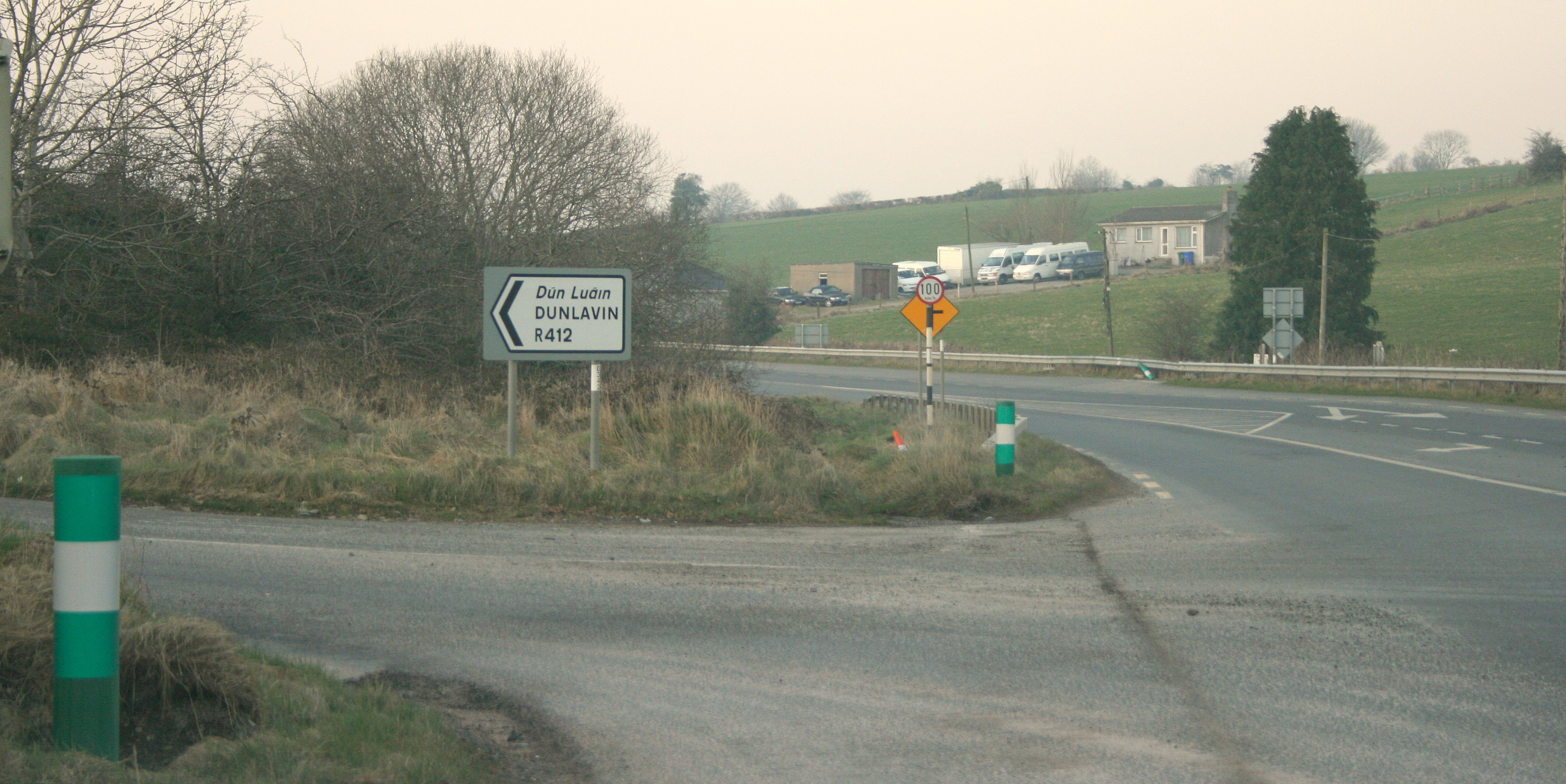
- R412 terminates at the N81

Route information
- Length: 20 km (12 mi)

Location
- Country: Ireland
- Primary destinations: County Kildare; Start at junction with the R448.; Brannockstown - joins/leaves the R413; County Wicklow; Dunlavin – (R756); Toberbeg; Terminates at junction with the N81

Highway system
- Roads in Ireland; Motorways; Primary; Secondary; Regional

The R412 road is a regional road in Ireland, which runs north-south from the R448 in County Kildare to the N81 in County Wicklow. En route is passes through the town of Dunlavin where it is joined by the road from Glendalough which crosses over the Wicklow Gap. The route is 20 km (12 mi) long.

== See also ==
- Roads in Ireland
- National primary road
- National secondary road
