= Allen, County Kildare =

Village in County Kildare, Ireland

Allen Alúine
- Village
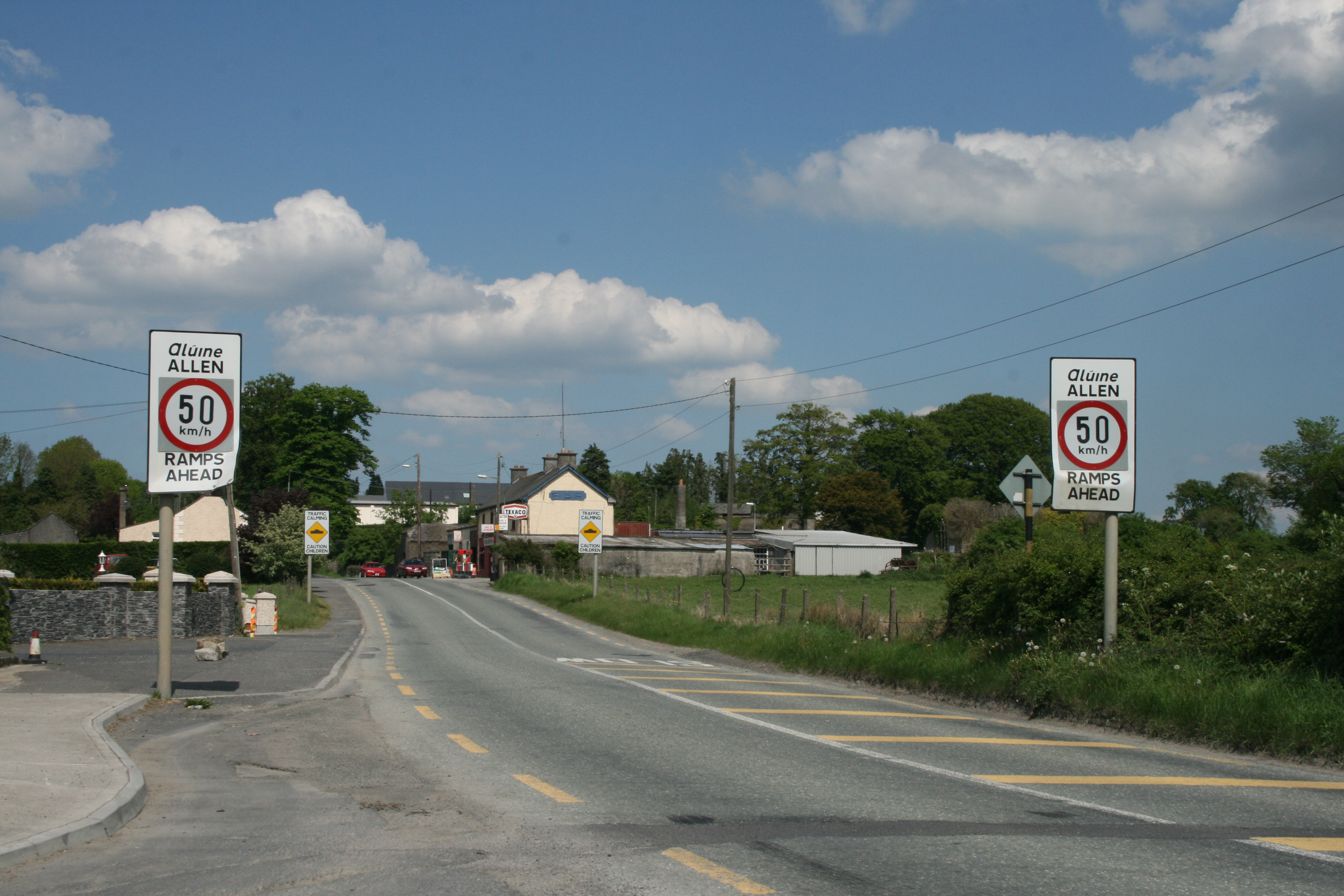

- Location in Ireland
- Coordinates: 53°14′09″N 6°51′27″W
- Country: Ireland
- Province: Leinster
- County: County Kildare
- Time zone: UTC+0 (WET)
  - Summer (DST): UTC-1 (IST (WEST))
- Irish Grid Reference: N762212

Allen (Irish: Alúine) is a village in County Kildare in Ireland located on regional road R415 between Kilmeage and Milltown. The village is overlooked by Hill of Allen. This hill, visible over much of Kildare and the surrounding counties, is regarded as the ancient seat of Fionn mac Cumhaill.

== History ==
=== Battle of Allen ===
In AD 722 the Battle of Allen took place between the Leinstermen, commanded by their King, Murchad mac Brain Mut and the northern and southern Uí Néill, commanded by Fergal mac Máele Dúin, along with his son Aedh Allen, and Aedh Laighean, King of Uí Maine in Connacht.

== See also ==
- List of towns and villages in Ireland
- Allenwood
- Hill of Allen
- Bog of Allen
