= Nurney, County Kildare =

Nurney Irish: An Urnaí
- Village
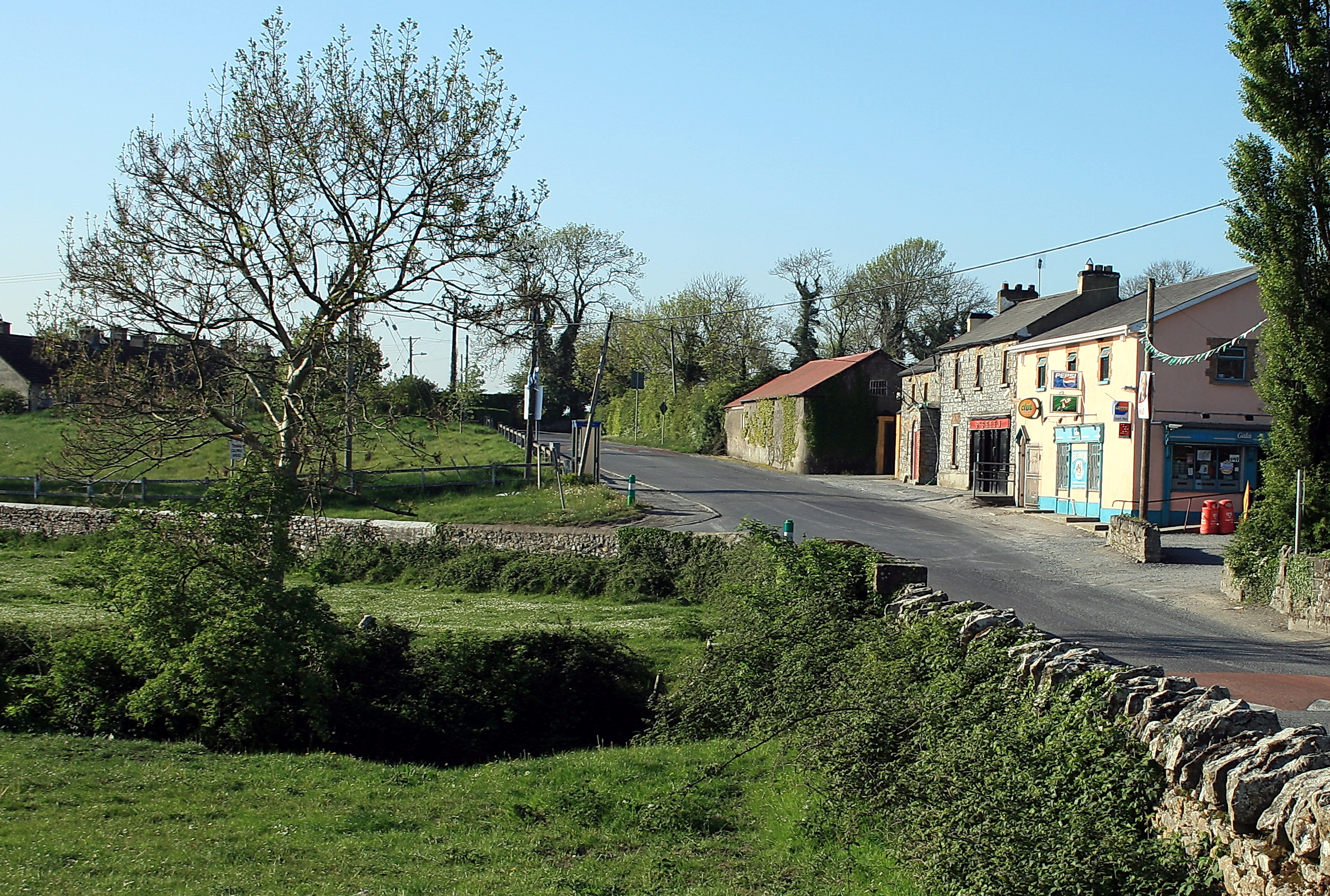

- Location in Ireland
- Coordinates: 53°05′42″N 6°56′52″W
- Country: Ireland
- Province: Leinster
- County: County Kildare
- Elevation: 71 m (233 ft)

Population (2022)
  - Total: 497
- Time zone: UTC+0 (WET)
  - Summer (DST): UTC-1 (IST (WEST))
- Irish Grid Reference: N704056

Nurney (Irish: An Urnaí, meaning 'the oratory') is a village, townland and civil parish in County Kildare, Ireland, on the Tully Stream.

== Location ==
Nurney lies on the R415 regional road 8 km south of Kildare and is signposted from the M7 motorway at junction 13.

== Transport ==
South Kildare Community Transport's Newbridge-Kildare-Athy bus route serves Nurney on Mondays to Fridays with two services each way a day. The bus also serves Kildare railway station, the nearest station to Nurney, enabling journeys to/from many parts of Ireland.

== Amenities ==
The village has a church, a pub, a school, a shop and two graveyards. A petrol station and a takeaway shop have opened in the village in recent times.

Skerries Irish Figure Dancing Class has been teaching Irish Figure dancing for over 40 years, and classes are held weekly in the local GAA hall.

== Demographics ==
In 2006, Nurney's population was recorded at 354, an increase of 48% from 2002. At the 2022 census, the population was 497.

== Sport ==
- Nurney GAA is the local Gaelic Athletic Association club.

== See also ==
- List of towns and villages in Ireland
