= Biddy Early =

Irish herbalist (1798–1874)

- Bríghid Léan Ní Chonchúir (Ní Maolmocheirghe)
- Born: Bridget Ellen Connors / O'Connor; 1798; Faha, County Clare, Ireland
- Died: 22 April 1874 (age about 76); Feakle, County Clare, Ireland
- Resting place: Feakle Graveyard
- Occupations: herbalist, diviner
- Spouses: Pat Malloy; John Malloy; Tom Flannery; Thomas Meaney
- Parents: John Thomas Connors (father); Ellen Connors (née Early) (mother)

Sites in Ireland associated with Biddy Early

Bridget Ellen "Biddy" Early (née O'Connor or Connors; 1798 – 1874) was a traditional Irish herbalist and bean-feasa ("seer, wisewoman") who helped her neighbours. When she acted against the wishes of the local tenant farmer landlords and Catholic priests she was falsely accused of witchcraft.

== Childhood ==
Biddy Early was born on Faha Ridge, County Clare, to John Thomas Connors, a poor farmer, and his wife Ellen (née Early). Biddy was baptised Bridget Ellen Connors but later adopted the Early name. As a child, she wore clothes that her mother made by weaving fibres from the flax that was grown nearby. She spent most of her time alone and was said to "talk to the fairies". She was good humoured and showed a keen intellect but, like most people of her time, she did not learn to read or write. With her family and friends she spoke Irish, but she had some knowledge of English.

Ellen Connors (née Early) was well known for her exceptional herbal cures and taught her daughter many of her recipes. These recipes were regarded as family secrets, as was common for the time. When Biddy was 16 years old, her mother died of malnutrition, leaving her in charge of the household. Just six months after her mother's death, her father died of typhus. Unable to pay the rent, she left her childhood home.

== Adult life ==
When Biddy was 18, she began working for a landlord in Carheen near Limerick, but she was often taunted for her aloof behaviour. She left after a short time and went to live in the local poorhouse, where she was treated even more poorly. During this period, she would often walk into Gurteenreagh on market days, and it was there that she met her first husband, Pat Malley of Feakle. The couple faced a number of obstacles: Pat was twice Biddy's age and already had a son and Biddy had no dowry to offer. However, they wed. After their marriage, Biddy gave birth to a daughter, her only child.

The family lived in a three-room cottage in Feakle, and this is where Biddy began to earn a reputation for her cures. Biddy never requested money for her services, but allowed her clients to decide how to compensate her. Whiskey and poitín were common trade items in those days, so her house was frequently stocked with an abundance of alcohol and eventually became known as a place where people could go to drink and play cards. Biddy was widowed at age 25. She later married her stepson, John Malley, shortly after Pat's death. During this marriage, her fame was increasing but her family life was frequently disrupted by large numbers of people coming and going at various times of the day and night. Her son, Paddy, left home some years after her marriage to John and never returned. John Malley died in 1840 from a liver ailment and Biddy was a widow again at 42.

Biddy's third marriage was to a man named Tom Flannery, who was younger than she was. Tom was a labourer and native of Finley, Quin, County Clare. The couple moved into a two-room cottage on Dromore Hill in Kilbarron. It was situated over a lake, which came to be known as Biddy Early's Lake. Her fame peaked during this period and her house became even busier and more crowded.

== Work and fame ==
When people didn't get the help they wanted from the priests or doctors, or if they couldn't afford to see a doctor, they would turn to Biddy. Her cures did not only consist of applying herbs to a wound or feeding a recipe to the sick. She was insightful and intuitive, which helped her to recognise and understand people's needs and choose appropriate yet creative measures to address them. Biddy was also called upon occasionally to treat animals. During her time, the death of an animal could lead to an inability to complete required tasks and cause a farm to fail. This was important because it could, in turn, lead to eviction and poverty and, in extreme cases, loss of human life. For the same reasons, farmers also asked Biddy to help with other problems related to daily life, such as restoring a spring well or fixing a problem with the farm's butter production.

At some point, Biddy acquired a bottle that became as famous as she was. She would frequently look into the bottle, which contained some sort of dark liquid, when considering possible cures for her visitors. She took the bottle everywhere, and it was even with her when she died. Her cures are the main reason she became well-known, but her strong personality was also an important factor. According to one biographer: "In many ways, what Biddy is purported to have done is what an oppressed peasantry would themselves wish to have done if they had dared, [because she was independent and refused to be] browbeaten by [the priests' and landlords'] authoritarian ways."

== Conflicts ==
Although the Catholic Church, which held authority over the lives of many people at the time, did not approve of Biddy's activities, she encouraged people to listen to its priests. The priests openly disapproved of her and discouraged people from visiting, yet some secretly continued to visit. People believed she was good, and some felt the real reason the priests didn't like her was that they "thought if Biddy wasn't [practising medicine] the people'd be going with five shillings an' ten shillings to themselves". This notion is repeated frequently in interviews with those who had personal knowledge of Biddy. Another contributing factor must have been the folklore and mysticism that surrounded her. While Biddy was from a class of small tenant farmers, the priests were usually from more comfortable backgrounds and placed emphasis on education, so they were "only too anxious to leave behind them the half-lit world of peasant lore and herbal medicine".

In 1865, Biddy was accused of witchcraft under the Witchcraft Act 1586 (28 Eliz. 1. c. 2 (I)) and was brought before a court in Ennis. This would have been unusual in the 1860s. The few who agreed to testify against her later backed out. She was released for lack of sufficient evidence. Many local people supported her.

== Old age and death ==
In 1868, Tom Flannery died, leaving Biddy widowed for the third time at age 70.

In 1869, at age 71, she was married for the fourth and final time to Thomas Meaney, a man in his 30s, in exchange for a cure. They lived together in her cottage in Kilbarron until he died, within a year of their marriage, from over-consumption of alcohol.

In 1874, Biddy died in poverty. A priest was present at her death, and her friend and neighbour, Pat Loughnane, arranged for her burial in Feakle Graveyard in County Clare.

== Legacy ==
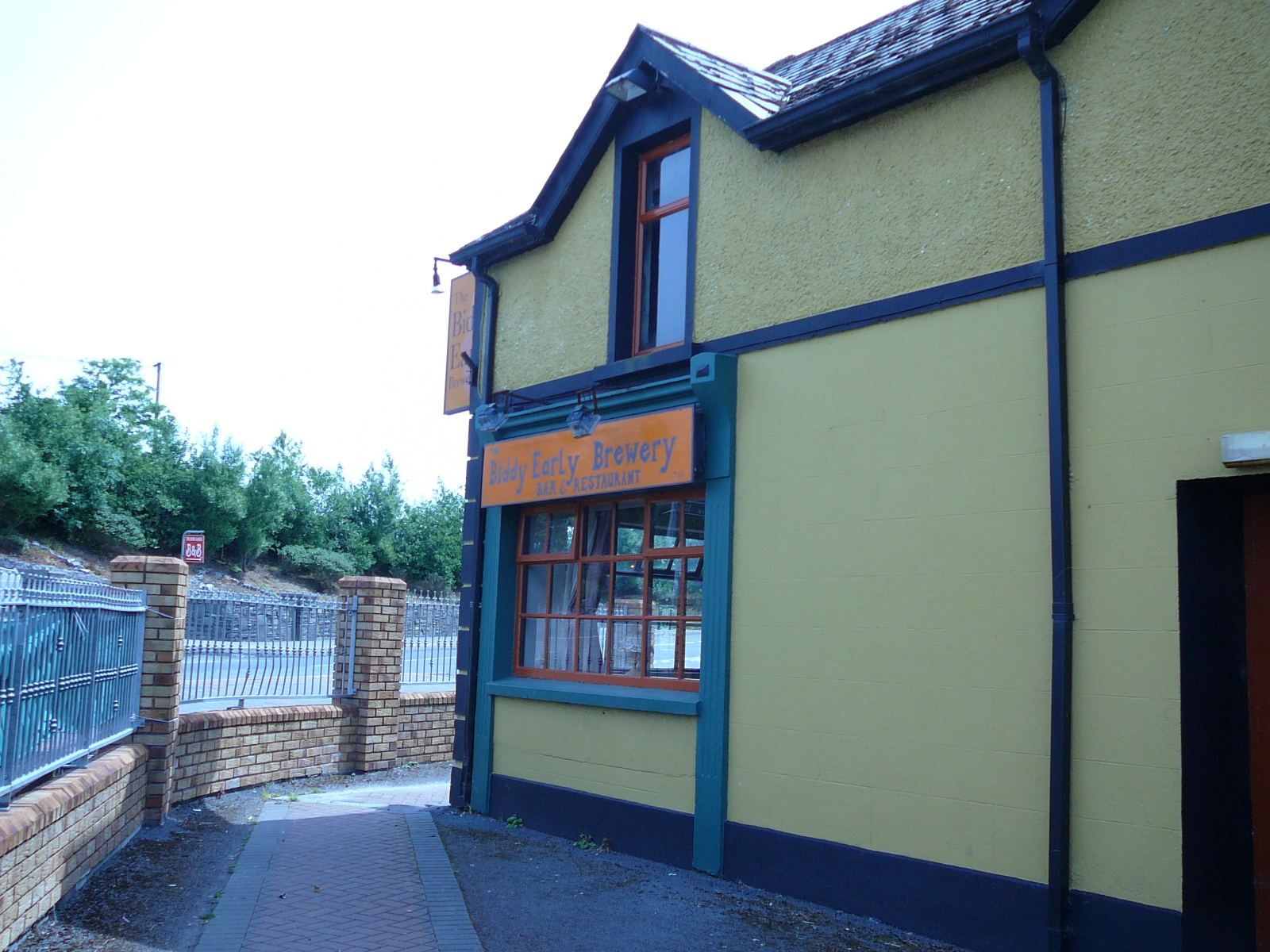
The former Biddy Early Brewery, Inagh.

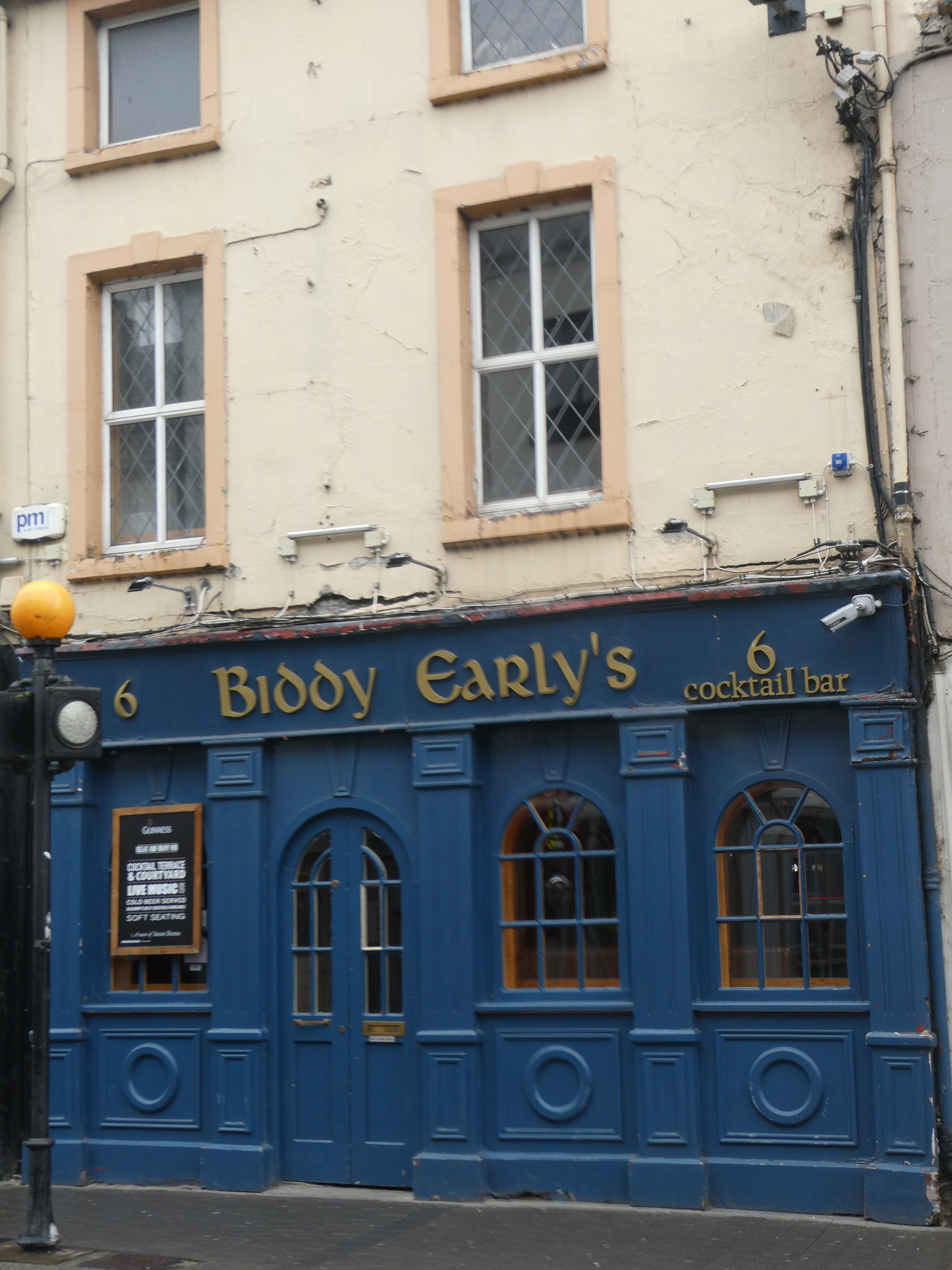
Pub named for Early, Kilkenny.

The last generation of people who had personal contact with Biddy ended in the 1950s. The stories that persist today originated in the strong oral tradition in the West of Ireland. Later, Lady Gregory compiled a valuable collection of stories 20 years after Biddy's death, and Meda Ryan and Edmund Lenihan wrote books that they based on interviews with many people whose parents or grandparents had personal contact with Biddy.

== See also ==
- Moll Anthony
- Cunning folk in Britain
- Curse of Biddy Early, afflicting Clare GAA and Galway GAA.
- The Fisherwife of Palermo
- Karin Svensdotter

== Bibliography ==
- Augusta, Lady Gregory (1920). Visions and Beliefs in the West of Ireland. Putnam's Sons, New York; 1920.
- Ryan, Meda (1978). Biddy Early: The Wise Woman of Clare. Mercier Press, Dublin; 1978.
- Yeats, William Butler (1920). Witches and Wizards and Irish Folk-Lore. Printed in Visions and Beliefs in the West of Ireland, collected and arranged by Lady Gregory (1920; rpt. New York: Oxford Univ. Press, 1970).
- Depuis, Nicola (2009). Mná Na HÉireann: Women who Shaped Ireland. Mercier Press, Cork; 2009. ISBN 978 1 85635 645 9
