= Crookstown, County Kildare =

Village in County Kildare, Ireland

Crookstown Baile an Chrócaigh
- Village
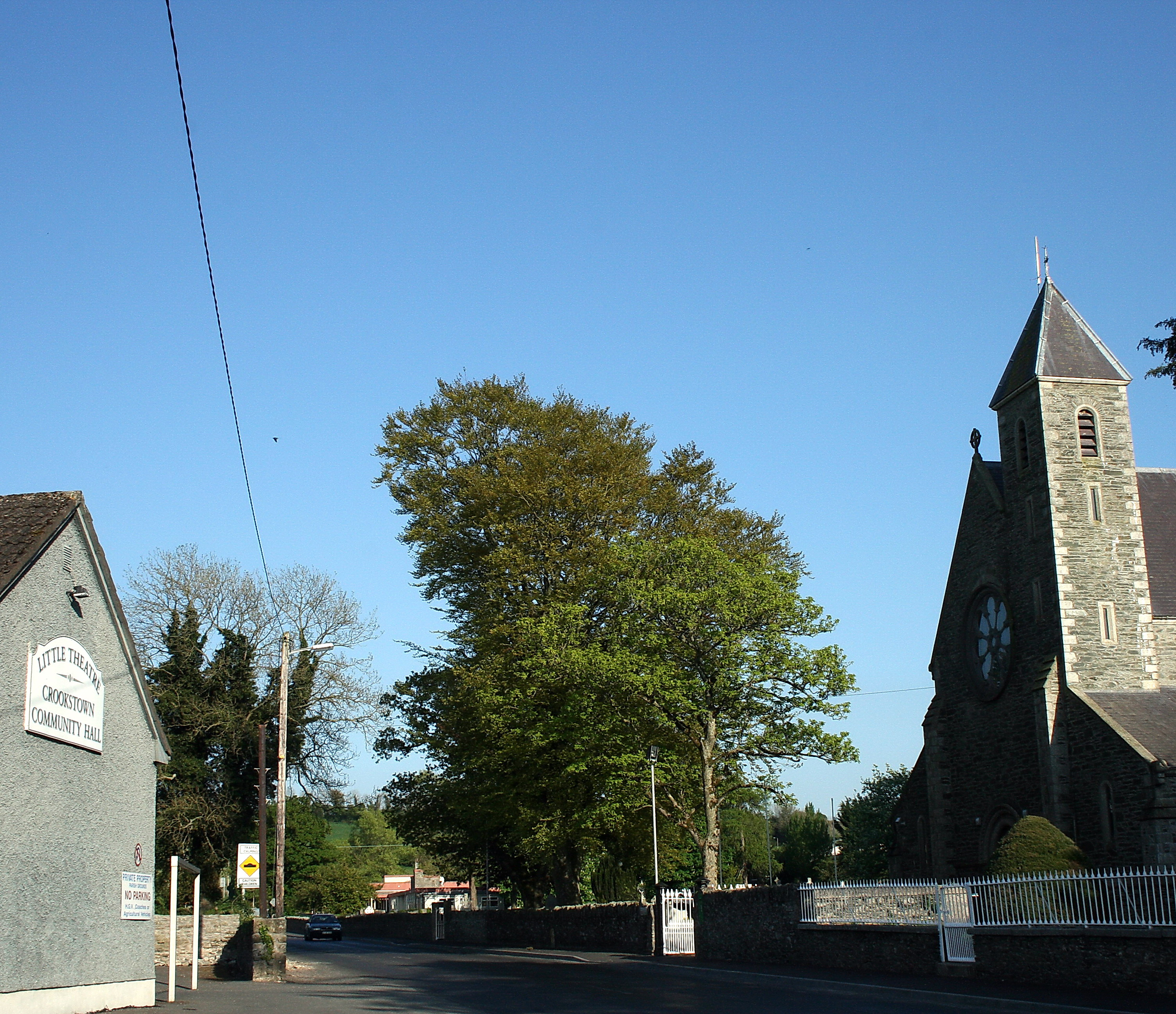
- Little Theatre, R415 and St. Mary and Laurence Church, designed by J. J. McCarthy in 1860

- Location in Ireland
- Coordinates: 53°01′11″N 6°48′10″W
- Country: Ireland
- Province: Leinster
- County: County Kildare
- Elevation: 100 m (330 ft)
- Time zone: UTC+0 (WET)
  - Summer (DST): UTC-1 (IST (WEST))
- Irish Grid Reference: S797969

Crookstown (Irish: Baile an Chrócaigh) is a village in the south of County Kildare, Ireland. It lies in the townland of Crookstown Upper on the R448 road where it meets the R415 regional road, about 75 km (47 mi) south of Dublin. It has a few hundred inhabitants, a church, a primary school, a petrol station/rest area on the N9, restaurant and some craft shops. It is less than one kilometre from the larger neighbouring village of Ballitore, and Crookstown is treated as part of Ballitore for census purposes.

== Name ==
The Placenames Database of Ireland records Crookstown in Irish as Baile an Chrócaigh (the town of Chrócaigh). Irish folklorist Tomás MacCormaic has stated that the name is a corruption of Bile Mac Cruaich (the Sacred Tree of the Sons of Cruaich), an ancient name for the parish of Narraghmore, which adjoins Crookstown. The name was recorded in Loca Patriciona, and it is possible that when first translated into English Bile became Baile, while Chrócaigh is a modern Irish variation of the personal name Cruaich. The tree was named after the two sons of Cruaich mac Duilge, Macha and h-Eircc, who were part of the Dál Cormaic, a Gaelic dynasty in the locality in the 5th century.

== Public transport ==
The village is served by bus route 880 operated by Kildare Local Link on behalf of the National Transport Authority. There are several buses each day including Sunday linking the village to Castledermot, Carlow and Naas as well as villages such as Moone in the area.

== See also ==
- List of towns and villages in Ireland
