= Allenwood, County Kildare =

Village in County Kildare, Ireland

Allenwood Fiodh Alúine
- Village
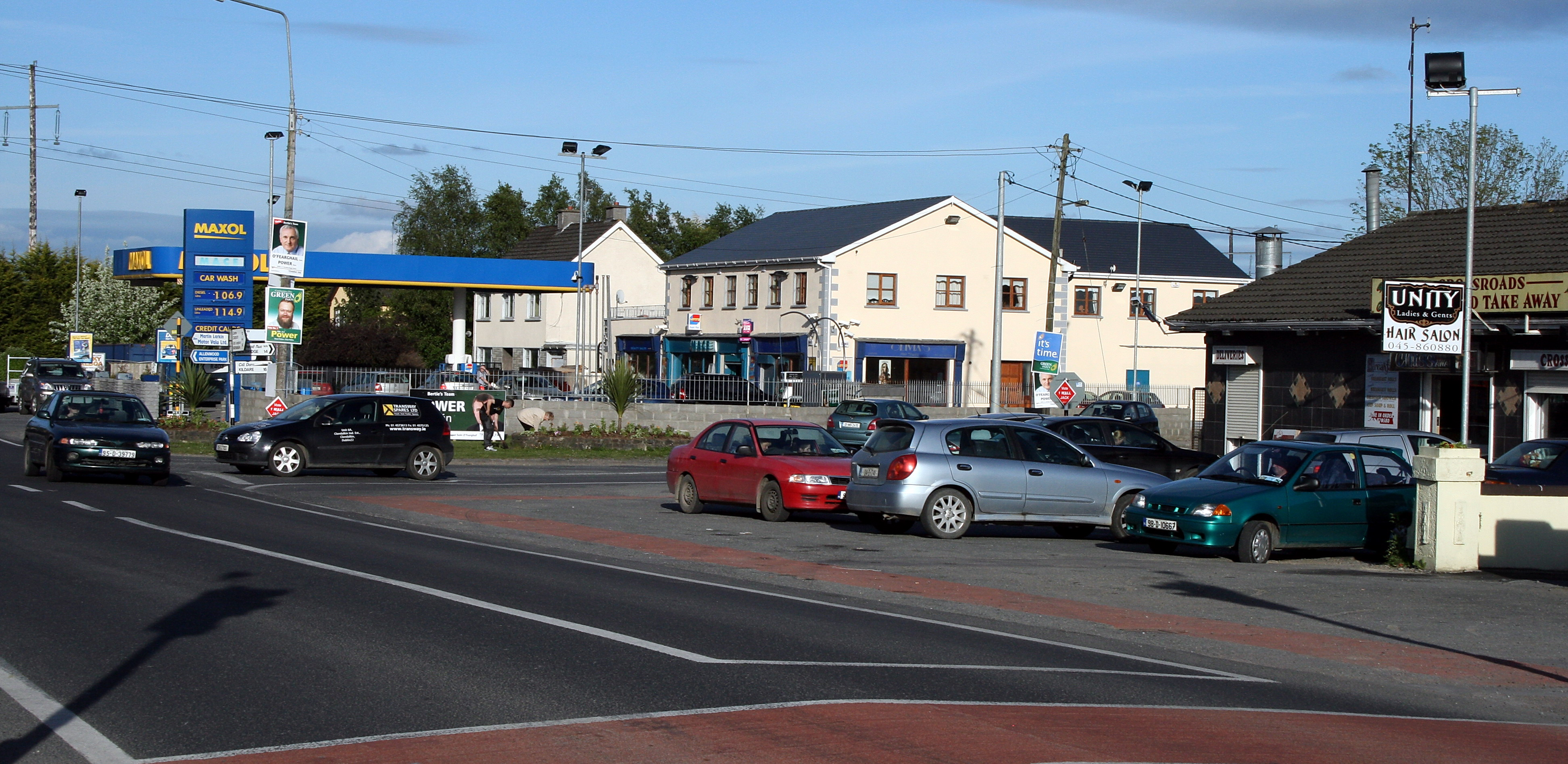
- R403 through Allenwood

- Location in Ireland
- Coordinates: 53°17′02″N 6°51′39″W
- Country: Ireland
- Province: Leinster
- County: County Kildare
- Elevation: 80 m (260 ft)

Population (2022)
  - Total: 1,685
- Time zone: UTC+0 (WET)
  - Summer (DST): UTC-1 (IST (WEST))
- Irish Grid Reference: N759266

Historical population
Year	Pop.	±%
1991	303	—
1996	341	+12.5%
2002	481	+41.1%
2006	667	+38.7%
2011	845	+26.7%
2016	981	+16.1%
2022	1,685	+71.8%

Allenwood (Irish: Fiodh Alúine) is a small Irish village in County Kildare situated on the Grand Canal. Allenwood is located about 47.3 km (29.4 mi) from Dublin and halfway between Rathangan and Clane in north County Kildare. According to the CSO, Allenwood had a total population of 1,685 inhabitants in the 2022 census, an increase 71.8% from the 2016 census. It is one of the fastest growing urban areas in the country.

The main road through Allenwood is the R403 and the village is within 20 km (12 mi) of both the M4 (to the north) and M7 (to the south) motorways.

Businesses in the area are centred on the crossroads, and consist of several shops, including a Spar, a costcutter, a barbers and a public house. There are two primary schools that were amalgamated into one in 2017, Allenwood G.N.S built in 1957 and Allenwood B.N.S built in 1929. The school is located next to the church which was built in 1954. There is also a business park at the location of the old power station. The Grand Canal is traversed by means of a noteworthy bridge, known locally as the Shee Bridge.

== History ==
Allenwood was developed in the nineteenth century as a coaching post along the Edenderry Road. Later residential development primarily occurred on local roads to the east of the village, typically as single plot developments.

Allenwood is the location of a former electricity power station which was fueled by peat from the surrounding bog lands. The station was built in 1952 by the Electricity Supply Board (ESB). The cooling tower which could be seen from over 30 km (19 mi), was demolished three years after the station was retired in 1994.

Bord na Móna which processed peat on the local boglands, established a camp for its workers at Allenwood Cross and the Roadstone quarry in Allen is also nearby. The industrial park located to the north-west of the village has grown around the location of the former ESB power plant.

== Recent developments ==
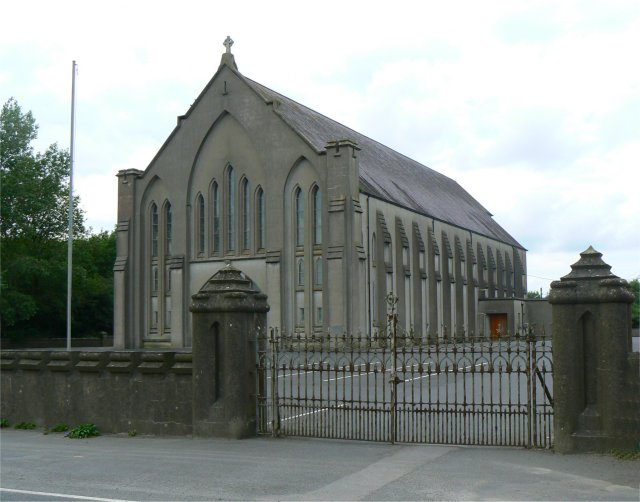
Allenwood church, built in 1954

Allenwood has undergone expansion in the early 21st century, with a four-fold population increase (from 481 to 1,685 inhabitants) between the 2002 and 2022 censuses. Several larger homes have been built in the area as well as a number of housing estates and apartments. As of Spring 2019, there were three housing estates under development.

Traffic lights were also added in late 2016 at the towns major crossroads. There is now provision for a new playground and the proposed Grand Canal Greenway would be a local amenity.

== Sport and recreation ==
The close proximity to the Grand Canal makes Allenwood a destination for fishing and walking. The local football club Allenwood G.F.C. is situated on the Station Road and offers its premises for a variety of other sports and recreations including kick boxing, dancing, scouting and annual school sports days. The local soccer club, Allenwood Celtic, is located outside the village on the Edenderry Road. There were several golf courses within a 15 km (9.3 miles) range of the village, but the nearest ones are now closed.

== Media ==
In 2024, former President of Ireland Mary McAleese joined forces with broadcaster Mary Kennedy to host the "Changing Times - The Allenwood Conversations" podcast. The podcast is produced by local producer Enda Grace at the Dundara Television and Media studio in Allenwood, County Kildare.

== Notable people ==
- Johnny Doyle, Kildare Senior Footballer and All Star.

== See also ==
List of towns and villages in Ireland
