= Kilmeage =

Village in County Kildare, Ireland

Kilmeague Irish: Cill Maodhóg
- Village
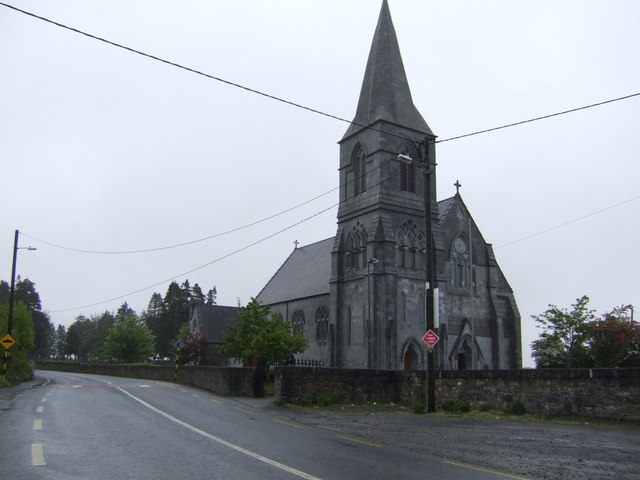
- Kilmeague church

- Location in Ireland
- Coordinates: 53°15′03″N 6°50′22″W
- Country: Ireland
- Province: Leinster
- County: County Kildare
- Elevation: 110 m (360 ft)

Population (2011)
  - Total: 997
- Irish Grid Reference: N774229

Historical population
Year	Pop.	±%
1841	142	—
1851	66	−53.5%
1861	149	+125.8%
1871	145	−2.7%
1936	64	−55.9%
1946	62	−3.1%
1951	59	−4.8%
1966	98	+66.1%
1986	382	+289.8%
1991	418	+9.4%
1996	451	+7.9%
2002	436	−3.3%
2006	683	+56.7%
2011	997	+46.0%

Kilmeague (Irish: Cill Maodhóg) is a village, townland and civil parish in west County Kildare, Ireland. In 2006, the village had a population of 997.

== See also ==
- List of towns and villages in Ireland
