= Hill of Allen =

Hill in County Kildare, Ireland

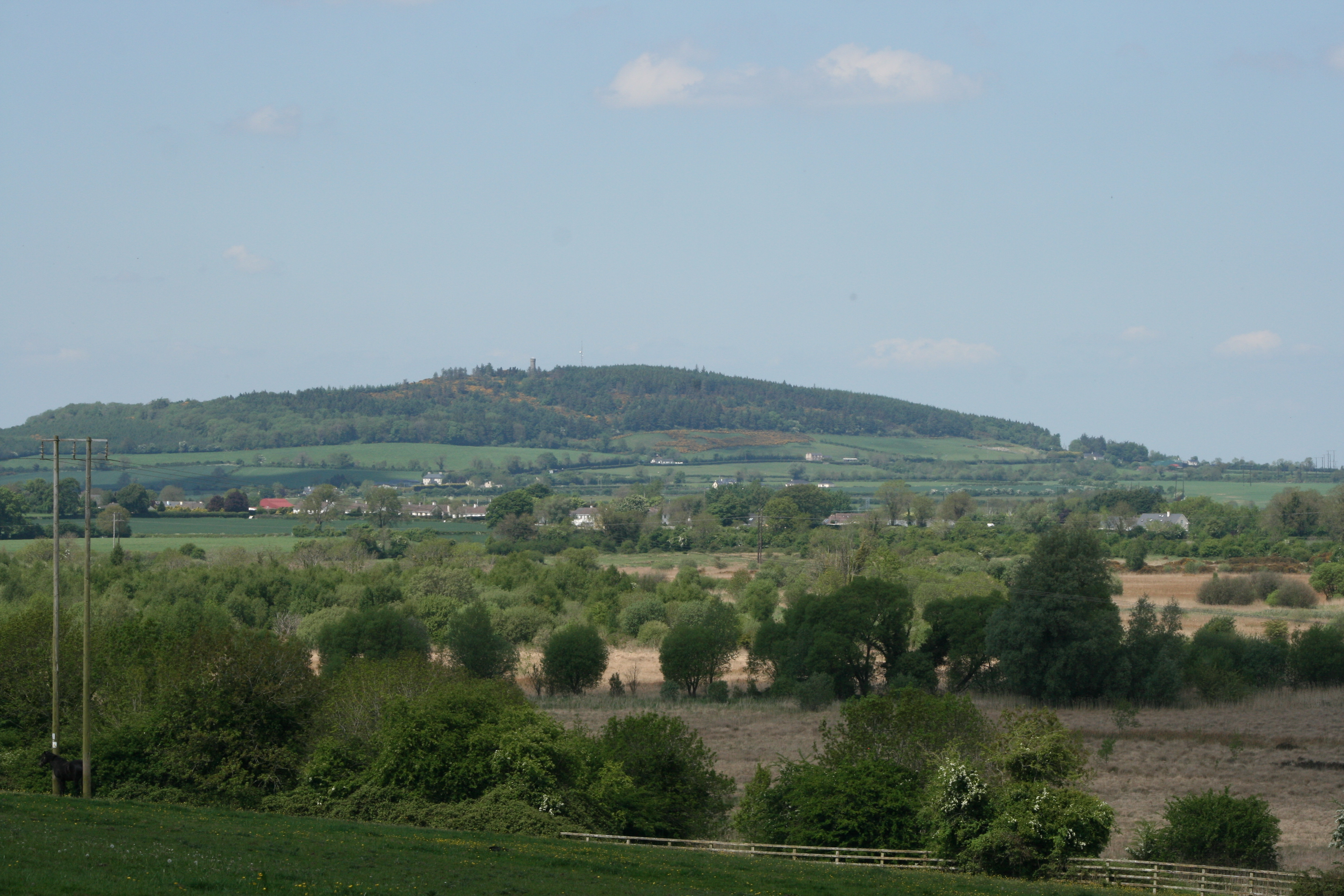
- Hill of Allen

Highest point
- Elevation: 206 m (676 ft)
- Coordinates: 53°13′46″N 6°51′50″W

Naming
- Native name: Cnoc Alúine

Geography
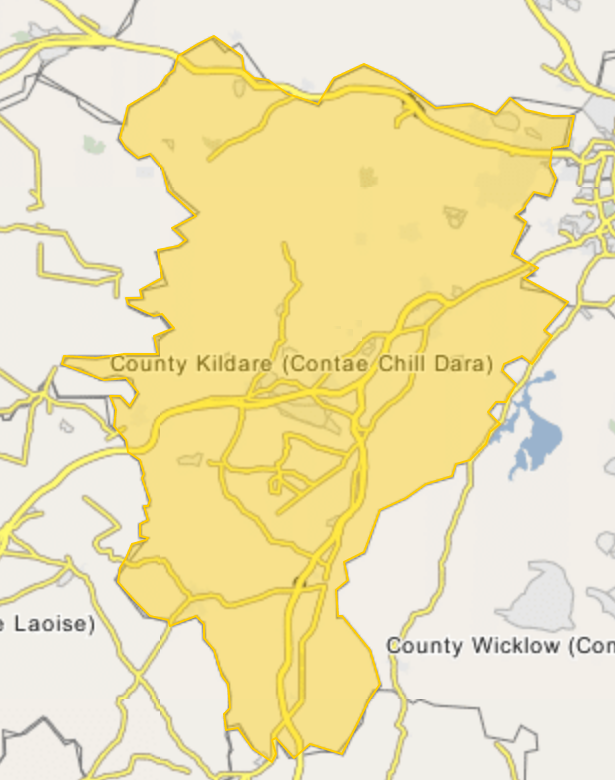
- Location within island of Ireland Location within County Kildare
- Location: County Kildare, Ireland
- Parent range: Chair of Kildare
- OSI/OSNI grid: N759205
- Topo map: OSi Discovery 49

The Hill of Allen (Cnoc Alúine in Modern Irish, earlier Cnoc Almaine; also Hill of Almu) is a volcanic hill situated in the west of County Kildare, Ireland, beside the village of Allen. According to Irish Mythology, it was the seat of the hunter-warrior Fionn mac Cumhaill and the Fianna. The site is currently part-owned by Roadstone Dublin Limited and extensive quarrying has noticeably changed the profile of the hill.

== History ==
The hill is situated at the easternmost point of the Bog of Allen and it is from this hill that the bog gets its name. According to legend, Fionn mac Cumhaill had a fortress on the hill and used the surrounding flatlands as training grounds for his warriors. In 722 A.D. the Battle of Allen was fought between the Leinstermen (Laigin), led by Murchad mac Brain Mut (King of Leinster), and the forces of Fergal mac Máele Dúin (High King of Ireland) near to the hill.

== Tower ==
In 1859 Sir Gerard George Aylmer, the 9th Baronet of Donadea began building a circular tower on the top of the hill, which was completed in 1863. The tower was a folly and the names of the workmen are inscribed on the steps.

During the construction of the tower a large coffin containing human bones was unearthed which were said to be those of Fionn mac Cumhaill. These were re-interred under the site.

== Quarry ==
As of 2008 most of the site is under the ownership of Roadstone Dublin Limited and much of the western side of the hill has been quarried. An agreement between Roadstone Dublin Limited and Kildare County Council allows quarrying to be carried out (subject to conditions) for a period of 50 years from 15 October 2008

== See also ==
- Dún Ailinne
- List of mountains in Ireland
