= County Kildare =

County in Ireland

County Kildare Contae Chill Dara
- County
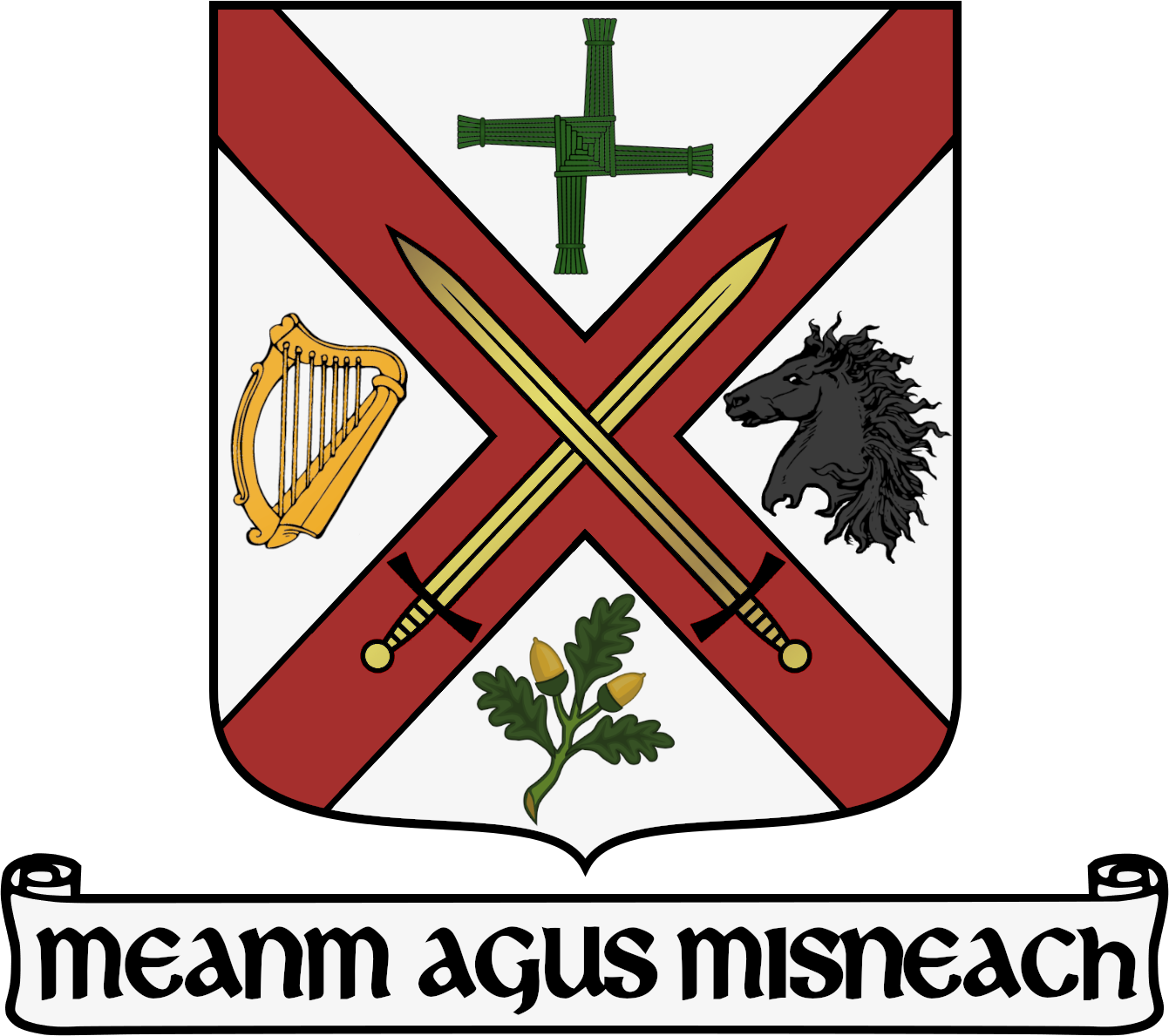
- Coat of arms
- Nickname: The Thoroughbred County
- Motto: Meanma agus Misneach (Irish) "Spirit and Courage"
- Interactive map of County Kildare
- Coordinates: 53°12′N 6°48′W
- Country: Ireland
- Province: Leinster
- Region: Eastern and Midland
- Established: 1297
- County town: Naas
- Largest settlement: Naas

Government
  - Local authority: Kildare County Council
  - Dáil constituencies: Kildare North; Kildare South
  - EP constituency: Midlands–North-West

Area
  - Total: 1,695 km^{2} (654 sq mi)
  - Rank: 24th
- Highest elevation (Cupidstown Hill): 379 m (1,243 ft)

Population (2022)
  - Total: 246,977
  - Rank: 7th
  - Density: 145.7/km^{2} (377.4/sq mi)
- Time zone: UTC±0 (WET)
  - Summer (DST): UTC+1 (IST)
- Eircode routing keys: R14, R45, R51, W12, W23, W34, W91 (primarily)
- Telephone area codes: 01, 045, 059 (primarily)
- ISO 3166 code: IE-KE
- Vehicle index mark code: KE
- Website: Official website

County Kildare (Irish: Contae Chill Dara) is a county in Ireland. It is in the province of Leinster and is part of the Eastern and Midland Region. It is named after the town of Kildare. Kildare County Council is the local authority for the county, which had a population of 246,977 at the 2022 census.

== Geography and subdivisions ==
Kildare is the 24th-largest of Ireland's 32 counties in area and the seventh-largest in terms of population. It is the eighth largest of Leinster's twelve counties in size, and the second largest in terms of population. It is bordered by the counties of Carlow, Laois, Meath, Offaly, South Dublin and Wicklow. As an inland county, Kildare is generally a lowland region. The county's highest points are the foothills of the Wicklow Mountains bordering to the east. The highest point in Kildare is Cupidstown Hill on the border with South Dublin, with the better-known Hill of Allen in central Kildare.

=== Towns and villages ===
- Allen
- Allenwood
- Ardclough
- Athy
- Ballitore
- Ballymore Eustace
- Calverstown
- Caragh
- Carbury
- Castledermot
- Celbridge
- Clane
- Coill Dubh
- Curragh
- Derrinturn
- Eadestown
- Johnstown
- Johnstownbridge
- Kilberry
- Kilcock
- Kilcullen
- Kildangan
- Kildare
- Kill
- Kilmead
- Kilmeage
- Kilteel
- Leixlip
- Lullymore
- Maynooth
- Milltown
- Monasterevin
- Moone
- Naas
- Narraghmore
- Newbridge
- Nurney
- Prosperous
- Rathangan
- Robertstown
- Sallins
- Staplestown
- Straffan
- Suncroft
- Timolin

=== Physical geography ===
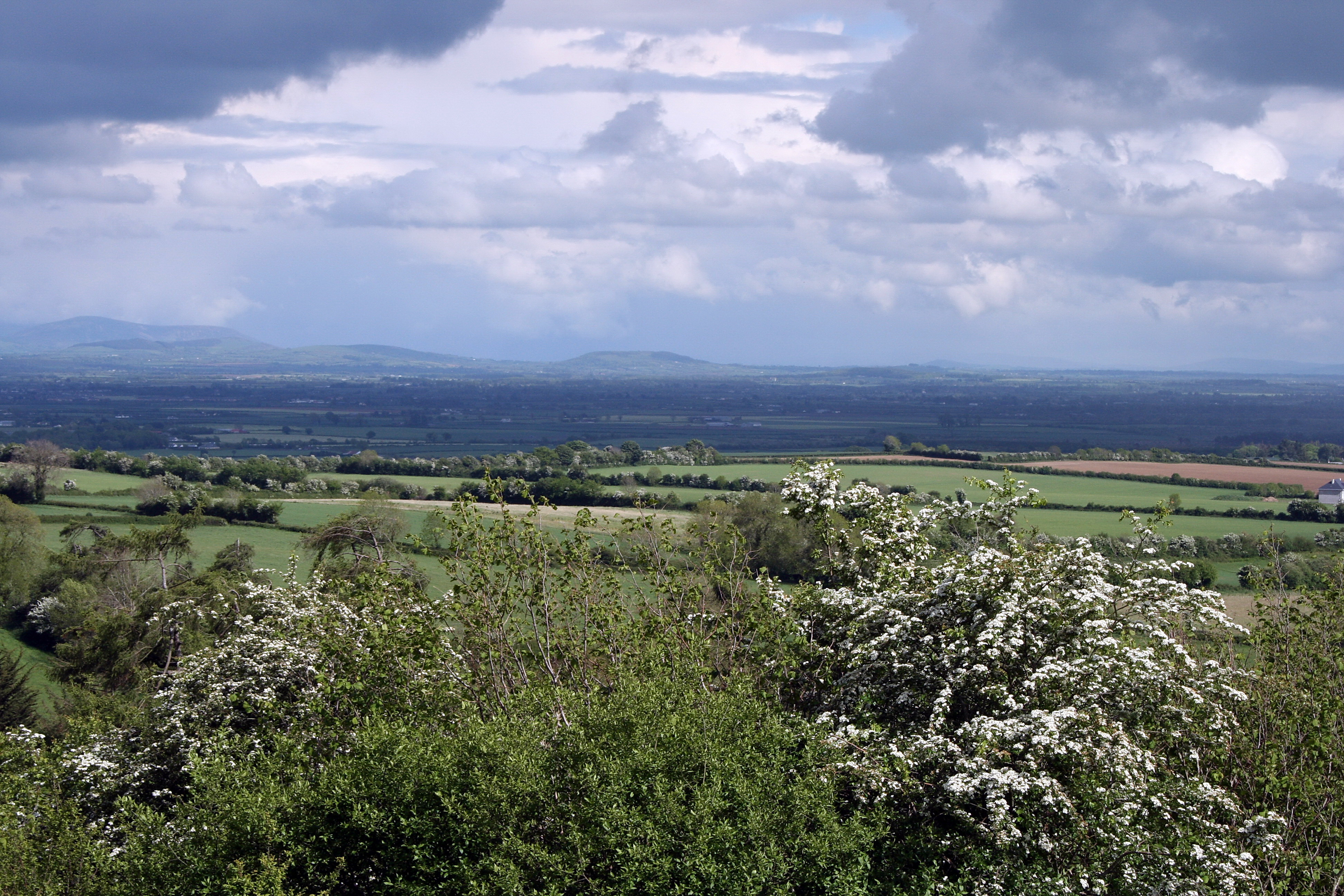
Looking east across the broad plains of South Kildare to the distant Wicklow Hills.

Historical population
Year	Pop.	±%
1500	2,887	—
1510	4,112	+42.4%
1550	5,033	+22.4%
1580	6,787	+34.8%
1585	3,454	−49.1%
1600	4,556	+31.9%
1610	8,714	+91.3%
1653	11,983	+37.5%
1659	13,825	+15.4%
1672	54,110	+291.4%
1788	71,570	+32.3%
1813	85,000	+18.8%
1821	99,065	+16.5%
1831	108,424	+9.4%
1841	114,488	+5.6%
1851	95,723	−16.4%
1861	90,946	−5.0%
1871	83,614	−8.1%
1881	75,804	−9.3%
1891	70,206	−7.4%
1901	63,566	−9.5%
1911	66,627	+4.8%
1926	58,028	−12.9%
1936	57,892	−0.2%
1946	64,849	+12.0%
1951	66,437	+2.4%
1956	65,915	−0.8%
1961	64,420	−2.3%
1966	66,404	+3.1%
1971	71,977	+8.4%
1979	97,185	+35.0%
1981	104,122	+7.1%
1986	116,247	+11.6%
1991	122,656	+5.5%
1996	134,992	+10.1%
2002	163,944	+21.4%
2006	186,335	+13.7%
2011	210,312	+12.9%
2016	222,504	+5.8%
2022	246,977	+11.0%

The county has three major rivers running through it: the Barrow, the Liffey and the Boyne. The Grand Canal crosses the county from Lyons on the east to Rathangan and Monasterevin on the west. A southern branch joins the Barrow navigation at Athy. The Royal Canal stretches across the north of the county along the border with Meath. Pollardstown Fen is the largest remaining calcareous fen in Ireland, covering an area of 220 hectares and is recognised as an internationally important fen ecosystem with unique and endangered plant communities, and was declared a National Nature Reserve in 1986.

The Bog of Allen is a large bog measuring 958 km^{2} (370 sq mi) that extends across County Kildare, County Meath, County Offaly, County Laois, and County Westmeath. Kildare has 243 km^{2} (94 sq mi) of bog (almost 14% of Kildare's land area) mostly located in the south-west and north-west, a majority of this being Raised Bog. It is a habitat for over 185 plant and animal species.

There are 8,472 hectares (20,930 acres) of forested land in Kildare, accounting for roughly 5% of the county's total land area. 4,056 hectares (10,020 acres) of this is coniferous, while there is 2,963 hectares (7,320 acres) of broadleaf and the remaining area are unclassified species. Coillte and Dúchas currently own 47% of the forestry. Coillte runs Donadea Forest Park which is in North-Central Kildare. The forest covers 259 hectares (640 acres) of mixed woodland (60% broadleaf, 40% conifer) and is the largest forest park in Kildare.

== History ==
Kildare was shired in 1297 and assumed its present borders in 1832, following amendments to remove a number of enclaves and exclaves.

The county was the home of the powerful Fitzgerald family. Parts of the county were also part of the Pale area around Dublin.

== Governance and politics ==
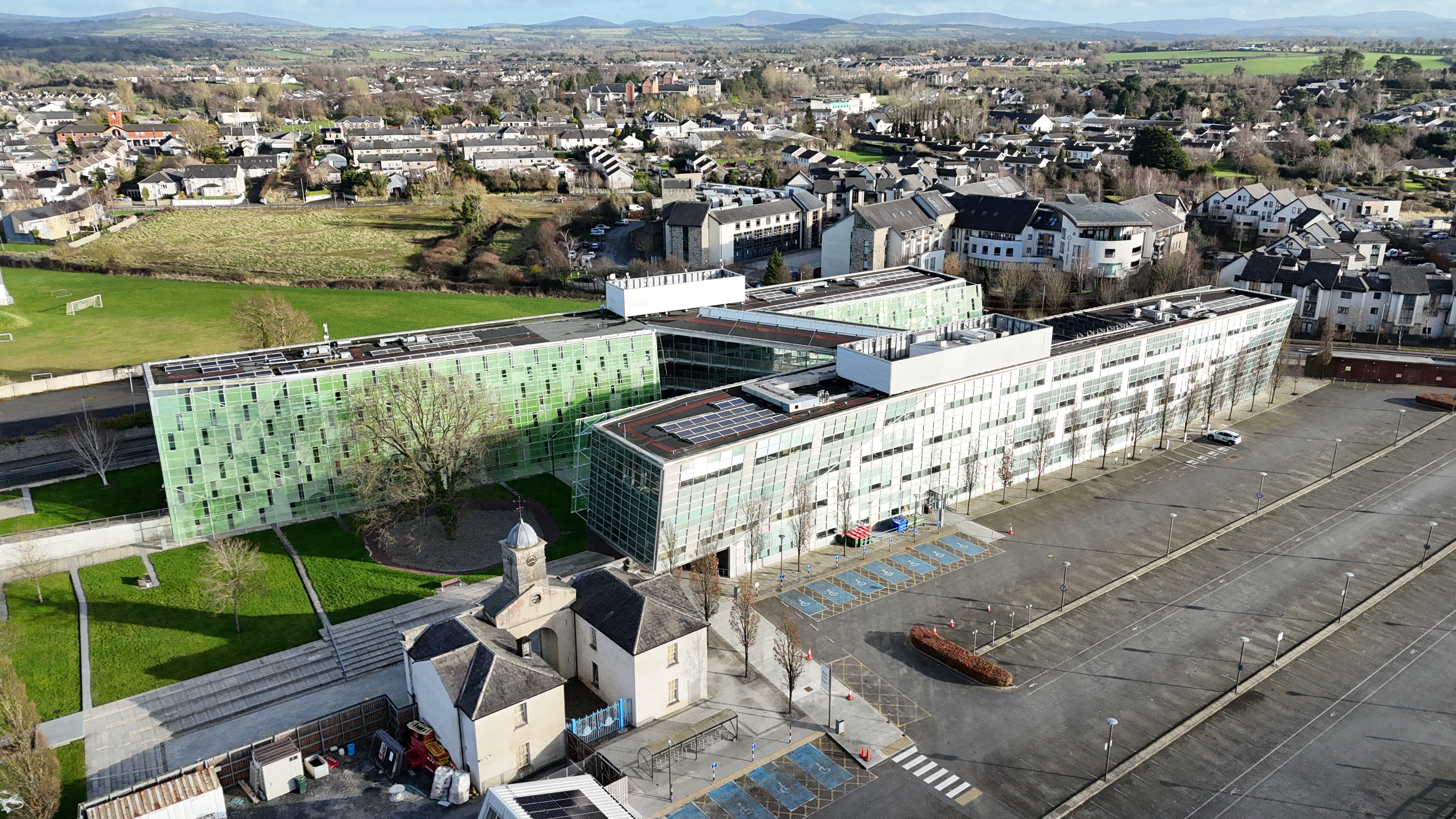
Kildare County Hall

The island of Ireland, showing location of County Kildare.

=== Local government ===
Kildare County Council is the local authority for the county. The council has 40 members, elected in the local electoral areas of: Athy (5 seats), Celbridge (4 seats), Leixlip (3 seats), Clane (5 seats), Maynooth (5 Seats), Kildare (5 seats), Newbridge (6 Seats) and Naas (7 Seats). These form the municipal districts of Athy, Celbridge–Leixlip, Clane–Maynooth, Kildare–Newbridge, and Naas. The current council was elected in May 2024.

Kildare County Council nominates three councillors to the Eastern and Midland Regional Assembly, who are part of the Mid-East strategic planning area committee.

=== Former districts ===
Kildare was formerly divided into the rural districts of Athy No. 1, Celbridge No. 1, Edenderry No. 2, and Naas No. 1, and the urban districts of Athy and Naas. The rural districts were abolished in 1925. Newbridge or Droichead Nua, within the former rural district of Naas No. 1, had town commissioners, and Leixlip was given that status too in 1988. The urban districts of Athy and Naas and the town commissioners of Newbridge and Leixlip became town councils in 2002. All town councils in Ireland were abolished in 2014.

=== National elections ===
For elections to Dáil Éireann, there are two constituencies in the county: Kildare North (5 seats) and Kildare South (4 seats). At the 2024 Irish general election, Kildare North returned Aidan Farrelly (SD), Réada Cronin (SF), Joe Neville (FG), Naoise Ó Cearúil (FF), and James Lawless (FF), while Kildare South returned Sean Ó Fearghaíl (FF) (returned automatically as outgoing Ceann Comhairle), Mark Wall (Labour), Martin Heydon (FG), and Shónagh Ní Raghallaigh (SF).

For elections to the European Parliament, it is part of the Midlands–North-West constituency (5 MEPs).

== Demographics ==
The county's population effectively doubled, from approximately 104,000 to 210,000, between 1981 and 2011. The northeastern region of Kildare had the highest average per-capita income in Ireland outside County Dublin in 2003. East Kildare's population has increased rapidly, for example, the population of the Naas suburb of Sallins increased sixfold (from 854 to 5,849) in the 20 years between the 1996 and 2016 census.

As of 2022 the population of the county was 246,977. Ethnically, the 2016 census recorded County Kildare as 84% white Irish, 9% other white ethnicities, 2% black, 2% Asian, 1% of other ethnicities, and 2% not stated. For religion, the census recorded a population that was 80% Catholic, 9% of other stated religions, 10% with no religion and 2% not stated.

=== Ethnic groups ===
Main immigrant groups, 2016
Nationality	Population
United Kingdom	10,527
Poland	6,869
Lithuania	1,550
Romania	1,156
Nigeria	1,120
Philippines	1,088
United States	1,082
India	929
Latvia	845
Moldova	829

=== Urban areas and populations ===
Town	Population 2016	Population 2022
Naas	21,393	26,180 (+4,787)
Newbridge	22,742	24,366 (+1,624)
Celbridge	20,288	20,601 (+313)
Maynooth	14,585	17,259 (+2,674)
Leixlip	15,504	16,733 (+1,229)
Athy	9,677	11,035 (+1,358)
Kildare	8,634	10,302 (+1,668)
Kilcock	6,093	8,674 (+2,581)
Clane	7,280	8,152 (+872)
Sallins	5,849	6,269 (+420)
Monasterevin	4,246	5,307 (+1,061)
Kill	3,348	3,818 (+470)
Kilcullen	3,710	3,815 (+105)

== Health care ==
County Kildare hospitals include Naas General Hospital and Clane General Hospital.

== Transport ==
=== Road ===
County Kildare houses the hub of Ireland's network of major roads.

The N4 (M4) from Dublin to Sligo travels along the north of the county by-passing the towns of Leixlip, Maynooth and Kilcock.

The M7 from Dublin to Limerick runs through the county and bypasses the towns of Naas, Newbridge, Kildare and Monasterevin. This road is colloquially referred to as the "Naas Dual carriageway" because when it was originally up-graded in 1964 the road from Dublin to Naas was a double-lane carriageway, one of the first of its kind in Ireland.

The M9 is another motorway that commences at Kilcullen and ends at Waterford. It is motorway standard for its entire length.

=== Rail ===
The county is also served by the trains connecting with Dublin, southern Leinster, Munster and Connacht, with daily connections to Cork, Waterford, Limerick, and Galway. The principal Irish Rail InterCity train station in the county is Kildare, however, Newbridge, Sallins and Hazelhatch are also served by South Western Commuter services, while Maynooth, in northern County Kildare, is served by Western Commuter and Sligo InterCity services.

=== Waterway ===
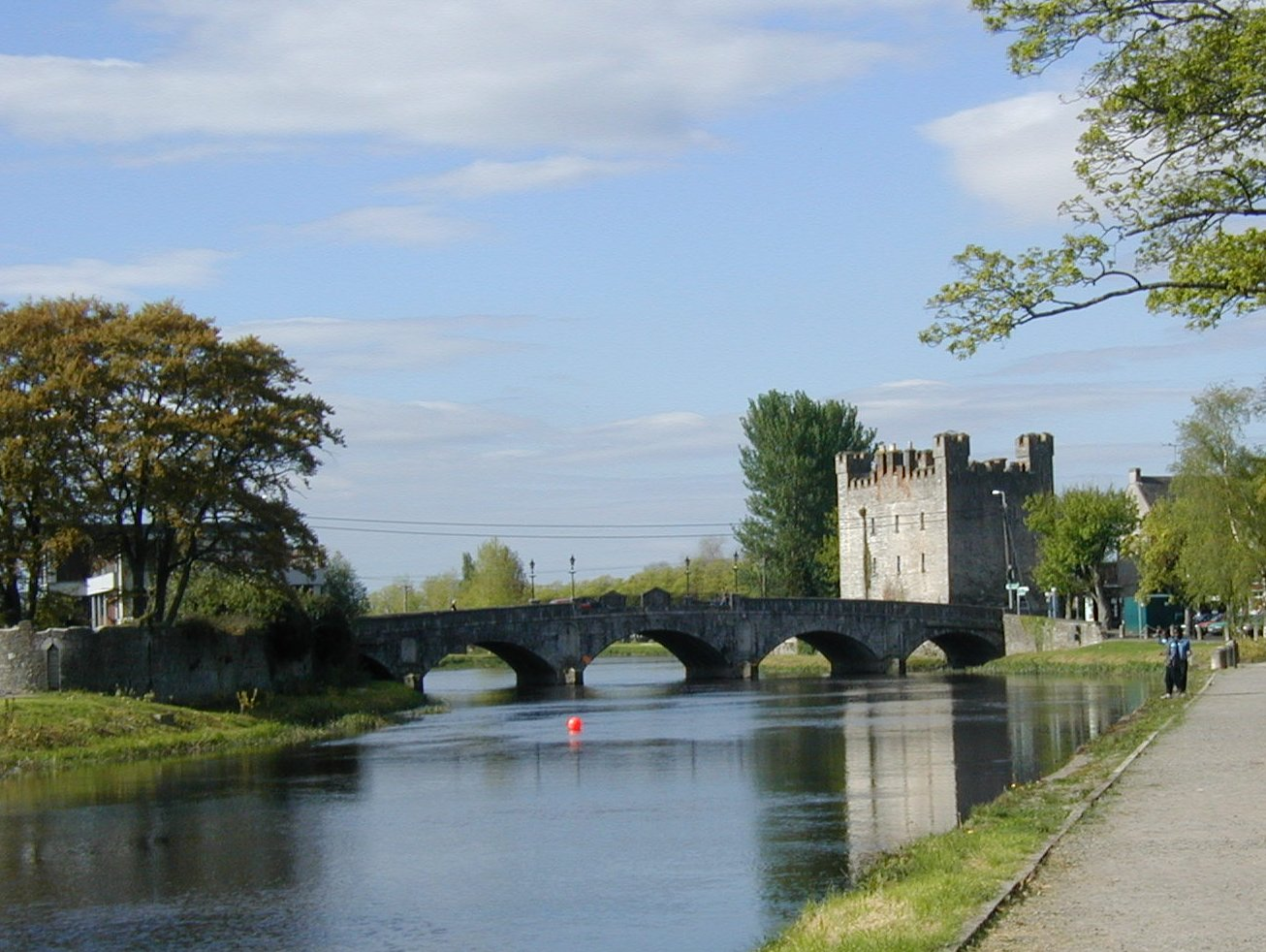
River Barrow and White's Castle, Athy

Kildare is the centre of Ireland's Grand Canal network built in the late 18th century. This connects Kildare with Waterford, Dublin, Limerick and Athlone. The Royal Canal runs west from Dublin and parts of it form the boundary with County Meath.

== Irish language ==
There are 4,491 Irish speakers in County Kildare; 2,451 attending the seven Gaelscoils (Irish language primary schools) and one Gaelcholáiste (Irish language secondary school). According to the Irish Census 2006, 2,040 people in the county identify themselves as being daily Irish speakers outside the education system.

== Education ==
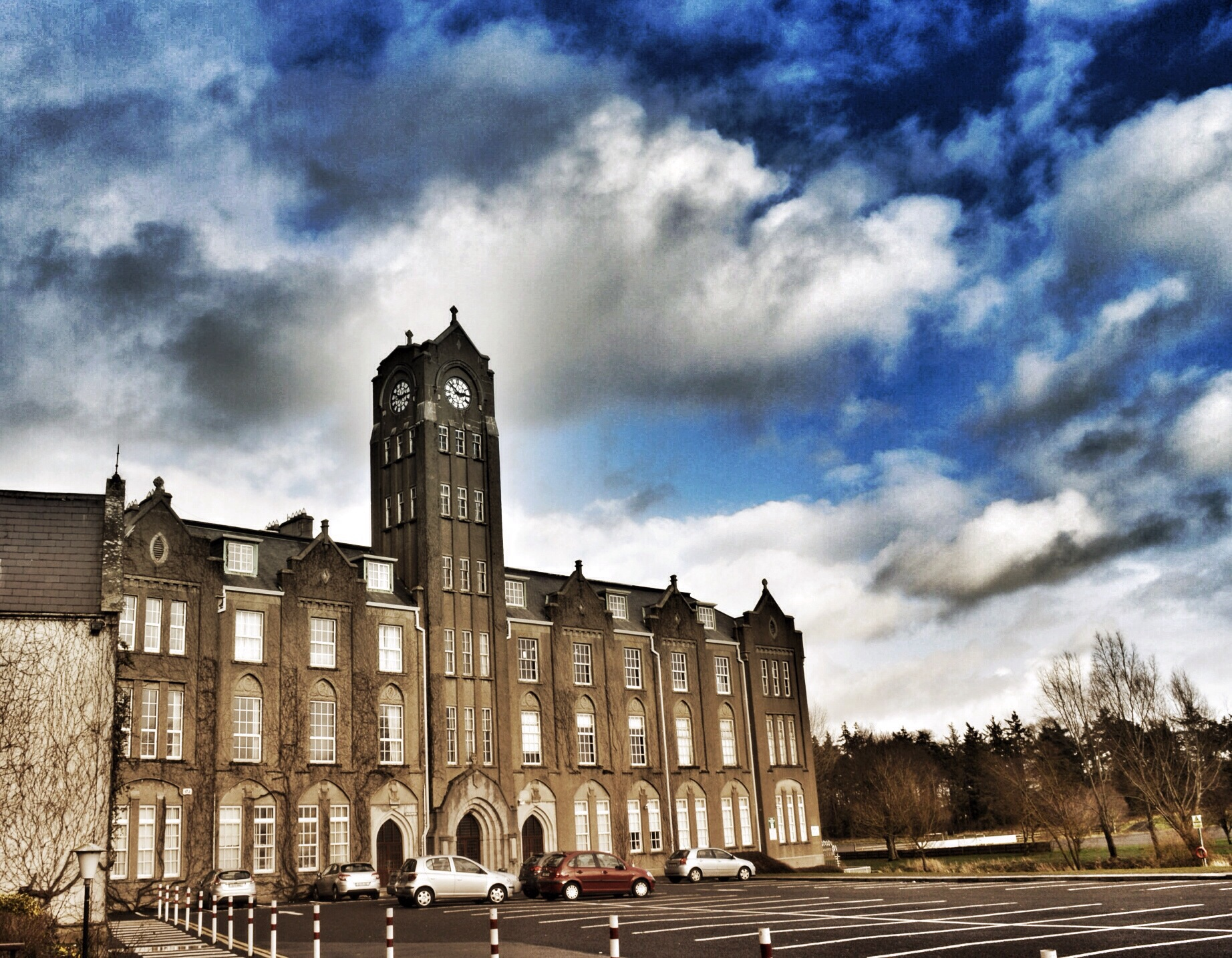
Newbridge College

- Two third-level educational institutions – St. Patrick's College founded by King George III in 1795 to educate Ireland's Catholics and Maynooth University founded in 1997 – are located in Maynooth. They share campus space and many facilities. The two institutions were formally separated in 1997. Maynooth University is the only university in the Republic of Ireland not situated in a city.
- Clongowes Wood College is a private secondary boarding school for boys, located near Clane. Founded by the Society of Jesus (The Jesuits) in 1814, it is one of Ireland's oldest Catholic schools.
- Newbridge College is a co-educational fee-paying secondary school. The Dominican Order founded Newbridge College in 1852 as a boarding school for boys.
- Leinster Senior College is a small private fee-paying secondary school geared solely towards the Leaving Certificate.
- The town of Clane is home to another educational institute, Clane College, a provider of further education to the wider Kildare community.
- Naas C.B.S., St. Mary's College Naas, Piper's Hill College and Gaelcholáiste Chill Dara are the main secondary schools in Naas.

== Sport ==
=== GAA ===
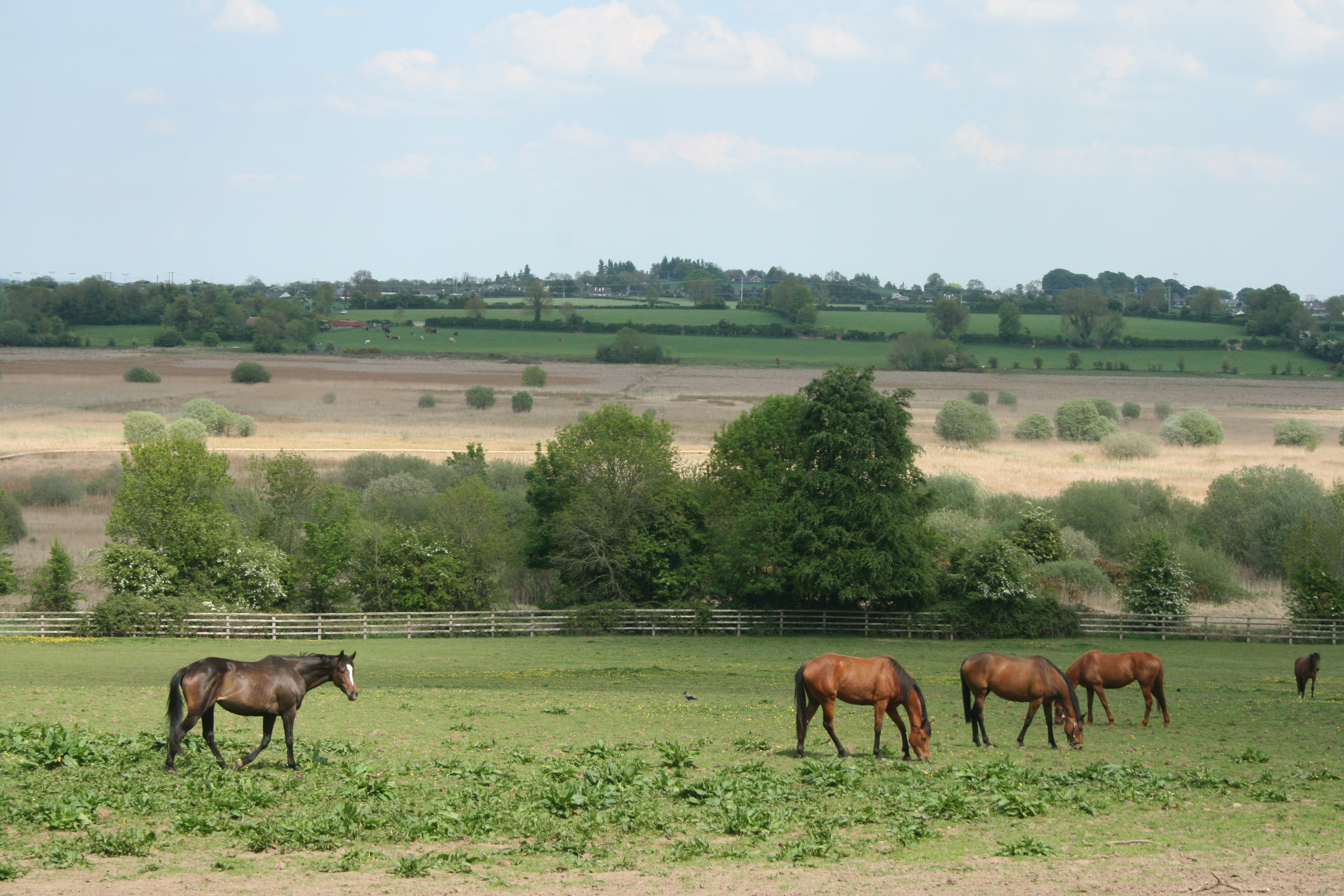
Horses near Pollardstown Fen

The nickname for the Kildare GAA team is the Lilywhites, as a result of its early jerseys being made from the bags of the Lilywhite Bakery. The all-white jerseys they wear are in reference to this.

In 1928, Kildare became the first team to win the Sam Maguire trophy for the All-Ireland Senior Football Championship, defeating Cavan 2–6 to 2–5. However, since then Kildare has reached the All-Ireland Football Championship Final on four occasions, the last being in 1998, but has failed on all four attempts.

County Kildare is also known as the Shortgrass County which is a reference to how short the grass is on the commons of the Curragh.

=== Golf ===
The Michael Smurfit owned K Club, situated on the River Liffey near Straffan played host to the 2006 Ryder Cup.

Carton House Golf Club is located in Maynooth. The Golfing Union of Ireland, the longest established golf union in the world, have their national headquarters on the estate. This facility also comprises the GUI National Academy, an 8.9-hectare (22-acre; 89,000-square-metre) teaching facility for up-and-coming golfers, as well as being a facility available to all golfers in Ireland.

Other prominent courses are located at Knockanally and Clane.

=== Horse racing ===
Kildare is famous worldwide for its horse racing. The Curragh horse-racing course is the home to all five Irish Classic Flat races. Also located in County Kildare are two other courses, Punchestown Racecourse, home of the National Hunt Festival of Ireland, and Naas Racecourse, which runs both National Hunt and Flat meetings and is used by top racehorse trainers as a test for horses preparing for the Cheltenham festival.

The county is famous for the quality of horses bred in the many stud farms to which it is home, including the Irish National Stud and many other top studs such as Gilltown, Moyglare and Kildangan Stud, and race horse training establishments, such as the Osborne Stables.

=== Motorsports ===
Kildare is the home to Mondello Park, Ireland's only international motorsport venue. The venue was established in 1968, and was purchased by Martin Birrane in 1986. Biranne oversaw major redevelopment of the venue with the incorporation of 3.5 km (2.2 mi) of race track, which was opened in 1998. The Circuit also has 3 km (1.9 mi) of extreme off-road driving trails and a 2-hectare (5-acre) off-road activities centre and the Museum of Motorsport. Mondello Park was awarded the FIA International race track status in 2001. It is host to National and International Race events, Motor Shows, Car & Bike Track days, Training Schools and Corporate Events.

=== Soccer ===
Soccer (association football) in County Kildare was represented at national level by Kildare County F.C., which competed in the League of Ireland from 2002 until its dissolution in 2009. Following a 17-year absence of League of Ireland football in the county, Newbridge Town F.C. was announced in 2026 as a new entrant to the FAI National League, restoring senior national league football to Kildare.

== Places of interest ==
- Castledermot Abbey
- Castledermot Round Tower
- Castletown House
- Curragh
- Maynooth Castle
- The Wonderful Barn

== Notable people ==
- George Barrington: pickpocket, socialite
- Eamon Broy: policeman
- Domhnall Ua Buachalla: Governor-General of the Irish Free State
- Ambrose Bury: Canadian politician
- Paul Cullen: Archbishop of Dublin and Archbishop of Armagh
- John Devoy: Fenian
- Charles FitzClarence: soldier
- Lord Edward FitzGerald: revolutionary
- Michael Gorman: American politician
- Arthur Guinness: Politician and brewer, founder of Guinness
- Gabriel Hayes: sculptor and coin designer
- John Vincent Holland: soldier
- Violet Key Jones: writer and suffragette
- Alma Jordan: farm safety advocate
- Michael Kelly Lawler: soldier
- Kathleen Lonsdale: scientist
- John de Robeck: admiral
- Barry St. Leger: soldier
- Ernest Shackleton: explorer

=== Sports ===
- Leighton Aspell: twice Grand National-winning jockey
- Nathan Collins : Brentford F.C. and Republic of Ireland national football team.
- Nonpareil Dempsey: boxer
- Matt Goff: Gaelic footballer
- Willoughby Hamilton: tennis player
- Jimmy O'Brien: plays for the Ireland national rugby sevens team
- Andrew Omobamidele : RC Strasbourg Alsace and Republic of Ireland national football team
- Conn McDunphy : Professional Cyclist, 2020 Cycling Ireland National Time Trial Champion.
- Hayley Nolan: Crystal Palace F.C. (Women) and Republic of Ireland women's national football team
- Larry Tompkins: Eadestown GAA
- Mark Travers : Everton F.C. and Republic of Ireland national football team
- Ruby Walsh : National Hunt Jockey

=== Writers, musicians, and entertainers ===
- Aisling Bea: actress, comedian
- Bell X1 are from Celbridge, County Kildare.
- Luka Bloom is from Newbridge
- Teresa Brayton: writer
- Joseph Doyle, bassist from Irish band The Frames is from Allenwood
- Aidan Higgins: writer
- Graham Hopkins, drummer with The Frames, The Swell Season, and Therapy? is from Clane
- Molly Keane: novelist
- Emily Lawless: writer
- Mary Leadbeater: writer
- Damien Leith, Australian Idol 2006 winner and singer-songwriter lived in Milltown until he moved to Australia.
- Jack Lukeman, otherwise known as Jack L, is from Athy
- Dónal Lunny was raised in Newbridge.
- John MacKenna: playwright, author, actor
- Paul Mescal: actor
- Miracle Bell, Indie-pop band
- Damien Molony: actor
- Christy Moore, folk musician, was born in Newbridge.
- Devon Murray: actor
- Liam O'Flynn from the band Planxty is from Kill
- Jean Sophia Pigott, Christian poet and hymn lyricist from Leixlip
- Damien Rice was born in Celbridge
- Heidi Talbot is from Kill

== Twinning ==
County Kildare is twinned with the following places:

- Deauville, France
- Lexington, Kentucky, US

Both are major centres of the Thoroughbred breeding industry in their respective countries.

== See also ==
- List of abbeys and priories in Ireland (County Kildare)
- Lord Lieutenant of Kildare
- High Sheriff of Kildare
