= 2024 Kildare Senior Hurling Championship =

Annual hurling competition season

- Dates: 5 July – 3 November 2024
- Teams: 8
- Sponsor: UPMC
- Champions: Naas (12th title); Brian Byrne (captain); Tom Mullally (manager)
- Runners-up: Maynooth; Johnny Greville (manager)

Tournament statistics
- Matches played: 20
- Goals scored: 67 (3.35 per match)
- Points scored: 616 (30.8 per match)
- Top scorer(s): Jack Sheridan (8-53)

The 2024 Kildare Senior Hurling Championship was the 127th staging of the Kildare Senior Hurling Championship since its establishment by the Kildare County Board in 1888. The championship ran from 5 July to 3 November 2024.

Naas were the defending champions.

The final was played on 3 November 2024 at Manguard Park in Newbridge, between Naas and Maynooth, in what was their second meeting in the final overall and a first meeting in two years. Naas won the match by 3-20 to 0-13 to claim their 12th championship title overall and a sixth title in succession.

Jack Sheridan was the championship's top scorer with 8-53.

== Team changes ==
=== To championship ===
Promoted from the Kildare Senior B Hurling Championship:

- Leixlip

=== From championship ===
Relegated to the Kildare Senior B Hurling Championship:

- Clane

== Qualifying stage ==
=== Preliminary round ===
5 July 2024 Preliminary round	Celbridge	2-19 - 0-14	Ardclough	Manguard Park
	J Dolan 1-5 (4 frees), C Treacy 0-4, P Hogan 1-0, N Ó Muineacháin 0-3 (2fs, 1’65), A McNiff 0-2, C Kirwan 0-2, G Keegan 0-1, C O Donovan 0-1, P Leahy 0-1.	Report	C Burke 0-5, S Whelan 0-4 (3 frees, M Stapleton 0-3, S Buggy 0-1, D Costello 0-1, P O Malley 0-1.

6 July 2024 Preliminary round	Maynooth	0-13 - 2-23	Naas	Manguard Park
	M Hogan 0-5, C Nolan 0-2, C Flanagan 0-2, M Butler 0-2, K Carroll 0-1, D O'Meara 0-1.		J Sheridan 0-11, B Byrne 1-5, F Maher 1-1, S Leacy 0-3, C Tobin 0-1, L Walsh 0-1, R Boran 0-1.

7 July 2024 Preliminary round	Leixlip	1-13 - 2-15	Confey	Celbridge Grounds
	J Roche 0-7, D Doherty 1-0, D Mooney 0-2, C Keegan 0-2, S Ryan 0-1, B Travers 0-1.		P Divilly 1-6, N Ryan 1-2, F Bass 0-5, B Grimes 0-1, K Kilbane 0-1.

7 July 2024 Preliminary round	Éire Óg-Corrachoill	1-13 - 1-10	Coill Dubh	Manguard Park
	P Freeman 0-5, C O'Reilly 1-1, S Cramer 0-2, P Cribbin 0-2, J Dolan 0-1, J Higgins 0-1, L Dempsey 0-1.		R Casey 1-1, C Carew 0-4, J Byrne 0-1, C Gordon 0-1, K Brereton 0-1, M Delaney 0-1, C Delaney 0-1.

== Group A ==
=== Group A table ===
Semi-finalists Quarter-finalists

Team	Matches				Score			Pts
Team	Pld	W	D	L	For	Against	Diff	Pts
Naas	3	3	0	0	106	34	72	6
Éire Óg-Corrachoill	3	2	0	1	59	66	-7	4
Confey	3	1	0	2	42	80	-38	2
Celbridge	3	0	0	3	47	73	-26	0

=== Group A results ===
20 July 2024 Round 1	Celbridge	0-13 - 0-15	Confey	Manguard Park
	G Keegan 0-5 (1f); A McNiff 0-1, J Connolly 0-1, F Ó Dullaigh 0-1 (’65); T Halpin 0-1, N Ó Muineacháin 0-1, C Treacy 0-1, P Leahy 0-1, C Kirwan 0-1.	Report	E Lynch 0-5, F Bass 0-3 (2fs,1’65), N Ryan 0-2, P Divilly 0-2 (1f); O Lynch 0-1 (f); B Grimes 0-1, A Crean 0-1.

20 July 2024 Round 1	Éire Óg-Corrachoill	0-09 - 4-18	Naas	Manguard Park
	P Freeman 0-3 (3fs), J Higgins 0-3 (1f), S Cramer 0-1; D Murray 0-1, P Cribbin 0-1.	Report	J Sheridan 2-8 (0-3fs,2’65s), C Tobin 1-3, K Aherne 1-0, F Maher 0-2, S Leacy 0-2, D Guerin 0-1; R Boran 0-1, K Whelan 0-1.

16 August 2024 Round 2	Celbridge	0-11 - 1-29	Naas	Manguard Park
	G Keegan 0-7 (5 frees), C Kirwan 0-1, P Hogan 0-1, F O Dullaigh 0-1, J Dolan 0-1.	Report	J Sheridan 0-16 (10 frees,2'65), S Leacy 1-1, C Boran 0-4, F Maher 0-2, D Guerin 0-2, K Whelan 0-1, C Dowling 0-1, C Boran 0-1, K Aherne 0-1.

17 August 2024 Round 2	Confey	0-13 - 3-14	Éire Óg-Corrachoill	Manguard Park
	F Bass 0-5, P Divilly 0-3, O Lynch 0-2, K Kilbane 0-1, E Lynch 0-1, S O'Neill 0-1.	Report	C O'Reilly 2-0, S Cramer 1-2, J Higgins 0-5, L Dempsey 0-3, G Johnson 0-2, J Dolan 0-1, S O'Neill 0-1.

7 September 2024 Round 3	Celbridge	1-20 - 5-12	Éire Óg-Corrachoill	Páirc Mhuire
	G Keegan 0-10, O Lynam 0-4, F Ó Dullaigh 1-0, S Gleeson 0-2, C Tracey 0-1, A Shanagher 0-1, J Dolan 0-1, K Robotham 0-1.		P Dolan 2-2, J Higgins 2-0, S O'Neill 1-1, L Dempsey 0-4, G Johnson 0-3, P Freeman 0-1, C O'Reill 0-1.

7 September 2024 Round 3	Confey	0-14 - 7-23	Naas	Manguard Park Pitch 1
	F Bass 0-13, B Grimes 0-1.		J Sheridan 4-3, B Byrne 0-7, J Burke 1-1, C Dowling 1-1, S Leacy 0-4, Cian Boran 1-0, Conan Boran 0-3, R Boran 0-2, C Tobin 0-1, L Walsh 0-1.

== Group B ==
=== Group B table ===
Semi-finalists Quarter-finalists Relegated

Team	Matches				Score			Pts
Team	Pld	W	D	L	For	Against	Diff	Pts
Maynooth	3	3	0	0	75	36	39	6
Ardclough	3	2	0	1	66	67	-1	4
Coill Dubh	3	1	0	2	44	56	-12	2
Leixlip	3	0	0	2	56	82	-26	0

=== Group B results ===
19 July 2024 Round 1	Leixlip	1-12 - 4-21	Maynooth	Manguard Park
	J Roche 0-5, S Ryan 1-0, J Canning 0-3, K Myles 0-2, C Burke 0-1, J McGonigle 0-1.		C McCabe 1-9, C Nolan 1-4, C Forde 1-2, K McNeill 1-0, M Hogan 0-2, K Dunne 0-2, C O'Grady 0-1, C Flanagan 0-1.

20 July 2024 Round 1	Coill Dubh	1-13 - 3-15	Ardclough	Manguard Park
	M Delaney 0-11 (8fs,1’65), R Casey 1-1, E Keane 0-1.	Report	C Burke 1-5, S Whelan 0-8 (5fs), E Walsh 1-0, T Ryan 1-0; M Stapleton 0-2.

16 August 2024 Round 2	Ardclough	5-13 - 2-19	Leixlip	Conneff Park
	S Whelan 1-10 (0-8f), E Walsh 3-0, C Burke 1-0, T Ryan 0-3;	Report	D Melville 1-13 (0-9f), C Keegan 1-0, J Canning 0-3, D Mooney 0-1, S Ryan 0-1; C Burke 0-1.

17 August 2024 Round 2	Coill Dubh	0-07 - 0-16	Maynooth	Manguard Park
	M Delaney 0-5 (4 frees), J Kenna 0-1, J Byrne 0-1.	Report	C McCabe 0-10 (4 frees, 2 65s), C Flanagan 0-2, D O'Meara 0-2, C Forde 0-1, C Nolan 0-1.

8 September 2024 Round 3	Coill Dubh	2-15 - 0-16	Leixlip	Manguard Park
	M Delaney 1-6, D Flaherty 0-4, J Kenna 1-0, J Byrne 0-2, E O'Neill 0-1, L Behan 0-1, M Grace 0-1.		D Melville 0-8, J Travers 0-2, J Roche 0-2, C Keegan 0-2, B Travers 0-1, J Canning 0-1.

8 September 2024 Round 3	Ardclough	0-14 - 4-14	Maynooth	Manguard Park Pitch 2
	S Whelan 0-5, C Burke 0-3, P O'Malley 0-2, T Spain 0-2, E Walsh 0-1, M Stapleton 0-1.		C McCabe 1-9, C Nolan 2-0, K Dunne 1-0, C Flanagan 0-2, C O'Grady 0-1, D O'Meara 0-1, M Hogan 0-1.

== Knockout stage ==
=== Quarter-final ===
22 September 2024 Quarter-final	Ardclough	3-12 - 3-16	Confey	Celbridge Main Pitch
	S Whelan 0-9 (7fs,1’65), T Ryan 2-0, T Spain 1-0, S Buggy 0-1; J Reeves 0-1, E Walsh 0-1.	Report	F Bass 0-7 (5fs,1’65), K Chan 2-0, E Lynch 1-0, N Ryan 0-3; O Lynch 0-2, A Ryan 0-1, N Glennon 0-1, P Divilly 0-1, B Grimes 0-1

=== Semi-finals ===
5 October 2024 Semi-final	Éire Óg-Corrachoill	1-16 - 2-18	Maynooth	Manguard Park
	Paul Dolan 1-11 (11 frees), N Cramer 0-1, S Cramer 0-1, J Higgins 0-1, P Freeman 0-1, C O'Reilly 0-1.	Report	K Dunne 2-3, C McCabe 0-8 (5 frees), D O'Meara 0-2, C Flanagan 0-2, C Forde 0-1, E Kelliher 0-1, C Nolan 0-1.

5 October 2024 Semi-final	Naas	3-28 - 0-07	Confey	Manguard Park
	J Sheridan 1-8 (6fs), S Leacy 1-3, Cian Boran 1-2, B Byrne 0-3, R Boran 0-3; L Walsh 0-2; F O’Sullivan 0-2, D Guerin 0-1; C Dowling 0-1, Conan Boran 0-1, F Maher 0-1, C Tobin 0-1.	Report	F Bass 0-7 (7fs).

=== Final ===
3 November 2024 Final	Maynooth	0-13 - 3-20	Naas	Manguard Park
	D Qualter 0-8 (5fs,1’65), C McCabe 0-3, D O’Meara 0-1; C Nolan 0-1.	Report	J Sheridan 1-7 (0-6fs), B Byrne 1-3, C Dowling 1-1, Cian Boran 0-3, F O’Sullivan 0-2, S Leacy 0-2, R Boran 0-1; K Harrington 0-1.	Referee: B O'Connell

== Championship statistics ==
=== Top scorers ===
Overall

Rank	Player	County	Tally	Total	Matches	Average
1	Jack Sheridan	Naas	8-53	77	6	12.83
2	Cathal McCabe	Maynooth	2-39	45	5	9.00
3	Frank Bass	Confey	0-40	40	6	6.66
4	Seán Whelan	Ardclough	1-36	39	5	7.80
5	Mark Delaney	Coill Dubh	1-23	26	4	6.50
6	Brian Byrne	Naas	2-18	24	6	3.00
6	Darragh Melville	Leixlip	1-21	24	2	12.00
8	Gerry Keegan	Celbridge	0-23	23	4	5.75
9	Paul Dolan	Éire Óg-Corrachoill	3-13	22	2	11.00
10	Cillian Burke	Ardclough	2-13	19	4	4.75

Single game

Rank	Player	Club	Tally	Total	Opposition
1	Darragh Melville	Leixlip	1-13	16	Ardclough
1	Jack Sheridan	Naas	0-16	16	Celbridge
3	Jack Sheridan	Naas	4-03	15	Confey
4	Jack Sheridan	Naas	2-08	14	Éire Óg-Corrachoill
4	Paul Dolan	Éire Óg-Corrachoill	1-11	14	Maynooth
6	Seán Whelan	Ardclough	1-10	13	Leixlip
6	Frank Bass	Confey	0-13	13	Naas
8	Cathal McCabe	Maynooth	1-09	12	Leixlip
8	Cathal McCabe	Maynooth	1-09	12	Ardsclough
10	Jack Sheridan	Naas	1-08	11	Confey
10	Jack Sheridan	Naas	0-11	11	Maynooth
10	Mark Delaney	Coill Dubh	0-11	11	Ardclough
