= 2025 Kildare Senior Hurling Championship =

Annual hurling competition season

- Dates: 27 June – 12 October 2025
- Teams: 8
- Sponsor: UPMC
- Champions: Naas (13th title); Brian Byrne (captain); Tom Mullally (manager)
- Runners-up: Maynooth
- Relegated: Moorefield

Tournament statistics
- Matches played: 20
- Goals scored: 86 (4.3 per match)
- Points scored: 735 (36.75 per match)
- Top scorer(s): Jack Sheridan (7-43)

The 2025 Kildare Senior Hurling Championship was the 128th staging of the Kildare Senior Hurling Championship since its establishment by the Kildare County Board in 1888. The championship ran from 27 June to 12 October 2025.

Naas entered the championship as the defending champions.

The final was played on 12 October 2025 at Cedral St Conleth's Park in Newbridge, between Naas and Maynooth, in what was their third meeting in the final overall and a second consecutive meeting in the final. Naas won the match by 3–15 to 0–16 to claim their 13th championship title overall and a seventh consecutive title.

Jack Sheridan was the championship's top scorer with 7-43.

== Team changes ==
=== To championship ===
Promoted from the Kildare Senior B Hurling Championship:

- Moorefield

=== From championship ===
Relegated to the Kildare Senior B Hurling Championship:

- Leixlip

== Qualifying stage ==
=== Preliminary round ===
27 June 2025 Preliminary round	Naas	0-22 - 1-10	Coill Dubh	Manguard Park
	J Sheridan 0-6 (3fs, 1’65), F O’Sullivan 0-3, MD Moore 0-3, K Harrington 0-3, C Carroll 0-2, C Boran 0-2, R Boran 0-1, E O’Brien 0-1, C Dowling 0-1.	Report	M Delaney 0-5 (3fs, 2s), D Flaherty 0-4 (1’65), E O’Neill 1-0, J Byrne 0-1.

27 June 2025 Preliminary round	Celbridge	3-23 - 4-16	Maynooth	Conneff Park
	G Keegan 0-9, C Tracey 2-2, M Owens 0-4, M Moloney 0-4, B Elliott 1-0, O Lynam 0-1, P Hogan 0-1, C Tracey 0-1, J Dolan 0-1.		D Qualter 2-6, C Nolan 1-2, C O'Grady 0-4, K Dunne 1-0, O Byrne 0-2, M Hogan 0-1, T Power 0-1.

28 June 2025 Preliminary round	Moorefield	1-14 - 1-18	Confey	Conneff Park
	R Gavin 0-8 (6fs); I McDonnell 1-0, A Bell 0-2, A Flood 0-1, C Kehoe 0-1, S Maher 0-1 (f), N Barry 0-1.	Report	F Bass 1-9 (8fs,1’65), B Keane 0-3, N Ryan 0-2, B Grimes 0-1, B O’Boyle 0-1, C Noctor 0-1, K Chan 0-1.

28 June 2025 Preliminary round	Éire Óg-Corrachoill	1-30 - 3-24; Penalties: 4-2	Ardclough	Conneff Park
	L Dempsey 0-15 (0-10 frees), P Dolan 1-3, S Cramer 0-5, G Johnson 0-3, J Higgins 0-2, A Delmer 0-1, S O'Neill 0-1.	Report	S Whelan 0-12 (0-7 frees, 0-2 '65), R O'Malley 2-0, T Ryan 1-2, E Walsh 0-4, P O'Malley 0-1, T Spain 0-1, K Kelly 0-1, M Sexton 0-1, C Burke 0-1, S Coulston 0-1.

== Group A ==
=== Group A table ===
Semi-finalists Quarter-finalists

Team	Matches				Score			Pts
Team	Pld	W	D	L	For	Against	Diff	Pts
Naas	3	3	0	0	112	40	72	6
Éire Óg-Corrachoill	3	2	0	1	69	76	-7	4
Celbridge	3	1	0	2	70	64	6	2
Confey	3	0	0	3	38	109	-71	0

=== Group A results ===
13 July 2025 Round 1	Confey	0-08 - 5-28	Naas	Cedral St Conleth's Park
	Frank Bass 0-5 (4 frees), Paul Divilly 0-1, Luke Quinn 0-1.	Report	J Sheridan 2-5 (4 frees, 65), C Boran 1-4, K Harrington 1-2, C Carroll 1-2, M Moore 0-3, E O'Brian 0-3, B Byrne 0-3, F O'Sullivan 0-2, C Dowling 0-2, H Carroll 0-2.

13 July 2025 Round 1	Celbridge	1-14 - 1-21	Éire Óg-Corrachoill	Cedral St Conleth's Park
	J Dolan 1-6 (3 frees), P Hogan 0-2, C Tracey 0-2, A McNiffe 0-2, F Ó Dulaing 0-1, O Lynam 0-1 (free).	Report	L Dempsey 0-8 (5 frees, 65), S Cramer 1-1, J Higgins 0-4, P Dolan 0-2, G Johnson 0-2, S O'Neill 0-2, M Clohessy 0-1, J Dolan 0-1.

25 July 2025 Round 2	Naas	3-18 - 1-15	Celbridge	Manguard Park
	J Sheridan 1-8 (two 65s, 5 frees), C Dowling 0-4, C Carroll 1-1, S Mac Donncha 1-0, K Whelan 0-1, B Byrne 0-1, R Kelly 0-1, R Boran 0-1, M Moore 0-1.	Report	G Keegan 0-7 (5 frees), C Tracey 0-3, A McNiffe 1-0, A Goss 0-2, M Owens 0-1, M Maloney 0-1, J Dolan 0-1.

26 July 2025 Round 2	Éire Óg-Corrachoill	5-16 - 0-17	Confey	Cedral St Conleth's Park
	S O'Neill 2-4, D Fitzpatrick 2-2 (1 free), L Dempsey 1-2 (penalty, 2 frees), P Dolan 0-4, S Cramer 0-2, G Johnson 0-1, N Cramer 0-1	Report	F Bass 0-12 (10 frees), N Ryan 0-2, C Chan 0-1, B Grimes 0-1, P Divilly 0-1 (free).

27 August 2025 Round 3	Éire Óg-Corrachoill	0-14 - 7-21	Naas	Cedral St Conleth's Park
	L Dempsey 0-8, P Dolan 0-2, M Clohessy 0-1, F Manders 0-1, J Higgins 0-1, S Cramer 0-1.		J Sheridan 2-5, F Maher 2-2, B Byrne 1-2, R Boran 1-2, C Carroll 1-0, M Moore 0-3, F O'Sullivan 0-2, C Dowling 0-2, C Boran 0-1, K Whelan 0-1, E O'Brien 0-1.

27 August 2025 Round 3	Confey	0-13 - 4-23	Celbridge	Manguard Park
	F Bass 0-6, N Ryan 0-2, B Grimes 0-2, B O'Boyle 0-1, A Crean 0-1, P Divilly 0-1.		G Keegan 0-12, J Dolan 2-3, A McNiffe 2-1, O Lynam 0-2, A Goss 0-2, M Owens 0-2, B Elliot 0-1.

== Group B ==
=== Group B table ===
Semi-finalists Quarter-finalists Relegated

Team	Matches				Score			Pts
Team	Pld	W	D	L	For	Against	Diff	Pts
Maynooth	3	3	0	0	101	61	40	6
Coill Dubh	3	2	0	1	67	71	-4	4
Ardclough	3	1	0	2	89	87	2	2
Moorefield	3	0	0	2	63	101	-38	0

=== Group B results ===
13 July 2025 Round 1	Maynooth	3-25 - 0-14	Moorefield	Manguard Park
	D Qualter 2-10, C Flanagan 0-4, K Dunne 1-0, C Dunne 0-3, C Nolan 0-2, O Byrne 0-2, H Dunne 0-1, C Forde 0-1, R Dunne 0-1, C O'Grady 0-1.		R Gavin 0-9, S Maher 0-3, A Bell 0-1, M Curtin 0-1.

13 July 2025 Round 1	Coill Dublin	4-14 - 1-13	Ardclough	Manguard Park
	J Byrne 1-4, E Keane 1-3, D Flaherty 1-3 (0-1 frees), M Delaney 1-2 (1-0 pen, 0-1 sideline), J Dee 0-1, C Gordon 0-1.	Report	S Whelan 0-7 (0-6 frees), T Ryan 1-1, C Burke 0-2, P O'Malley 0-2, R O'Malley 0-1.

25 July 2025 Round 2	Moorefield	1-23 - 1-24	Coill Dubh	Cedral St Conleth's Park
	R Gavin 0-10 (4 frees), A Bell 1-2 ( 1 penalty), C Kehoe 0-3, S Maher 0-3 (3 frees), A O'Brien 0-2, B Buckley 0-1, A Flood 0-1, T Walsh 0-1.	Report	M Delaney 1-7 (2 frees,1 penalty), J Byrne 0-7, D Flaherty 0-6 (2 frees), E Keane 0-2, J Dee 0-1, E O'Neill 0-1.

26 July 2025 Round 2	Ardclough	4-22 - 4-25	Maynooth	Cedral St Conleth's Park
	S Whelan 0-10 (5 frees), C Burke 1-4, E Walsh 1-3, M Fitzgerald 1-1 (2 frees), T Spain 1-2, D Costello 0-1, T Ryan 0-1.	Report	T Power 0-10 (7 frees), K Dunne 1-3, C McCabe 1-2, O Byrne 1-1, K Carroll 1-1, C Forde 0-2, C Dunne 0-2, T Forde 0-1, M Eustace 0-1, L Murnane 0-1, M Hogan 0-1.

28 August 2025 Round 3	Coill Dubh	2-08 - 2-23	Maynooth	Cedral St Conleth's Park
	C Carew 1-2, C Gordon 1-1, M Delaney 0-3, J Byrne 0-2.		T Power 1-10, T Forde 0-3, C McCabe 0-3, K Dunne 0-3, C Forde 0-2, C Dunne 0-1, O Byrne 0-1.

28 August 2025 Round 3	Moorefield	1-21 - 4-28	Ardclough	Manguard Park
	R Gavin 0-10 (4 frees, 65), A O'Brien 1-1, C Kehoe 0-2, S Maher 0-3, D Callahan 0-3, M Curtin 0-2.	Report	R O'Malley 3-3, E Walsh 1-4, M Fitzgerald 0-6, S Whelan 0-4 (4 frees), T Ryan 0-4, H Mughan 0-3, P O'Malley 0-2, T Spain 0-2.

== Knockout stage ==
=== Quarter-final ===
10 September 2025 Quarter-final	Celbridge	3-17 - 3-19	Coill Dubh	Manguard Park
	G Keegan 0-9 (3fs,1’65), B Elliott 2-0, A McNiffe 1-2, O Lynam 0-3, J Dolan 0-2, K Murphy 0-1.	Report	M Delaney 0-9 (2fs,1’65); J Byrne 1-2, É O’Neill 1-2, D Flaherty 1-1, C Carew 0-4 (1f), C Gordon 0-1.

=== Semi-finals ===
27 September 2025 Semi-final	Éire Óg-Corrachoill	2-16 - 2-22	Maynooth	Cedral St Conleth’s Park
	L Dempsey 0-8 (0-6 frees, 0-1 penalty), S O'Neill 2-0, P Dolan 0-3 (0-2 frees), J Higgins 0-2, S Cramer 0-1, G Johnson 0-1, D Fitzpatrick 0-1 (0-1 frees).	Report	T Power 0-9 (0-6 frees), C McCabe 0-7 (0-1 frees), O Byrne 0-4, T Forde 1-0, C Forde 1-0, M Quilty 0-2, K Dunne 0-2, A Jordan 0-1, C O'Grady 0-1.

27 September 2025 Semi-final	Naas	5-18 - 0-07	Coill Dubh	Cedral St Conleth’s Park
	J Sheridan 2-11 (10 frees, penalty), F Maher 2-0, S Leacy 1-0, B Byrne 0-3, C Boran 0-2, E O'Brian 0-1, F O'Sullivan 0-1.	Report	M Delaney 0-3 (3 frees), D Flaherty 0-2 (2 frees), C Gordon 0-1, J Byrne 0-1 (free).

=== Final ===
12 October 2025 Final	Naas	3-15 - 0-16	Maynooth	Cedral St Conleth’s Park
	J Sheridan 0-8 (5fs,1’65), K Harrington 1-1, F O’Sullivan 1-1, C Boran 1-0, B Byrne 0-2, S Leacy 0-1, C Dowling 0-1, C Sheridan 0-1.	Report	T Power 0-8 (8fs), C Nolan 0-2, O Byrne 0-2, C McCabe 0-1, C Flanagan 0-1; C Dunne 0-1, A Jordan 0-1.

== Championship statistics ==
=== Top scorers ===
Rank	Player	County	Tally	Total	Matches	Average
1	Jack Sheridan	Naas	7-43	64	6	10.66
2	Liam Dempsey	Éire Óg-Corrachoill	1-41	44	5	8.80
3	Tom Power	Maynooth	1-38	41	5	8.20
4	Gerry Keegan	Celbridge	0-37	37	4	9.25
4	Reece Gavin	Moorefield	0-37	37	4	9.25
