= 2026 Kildare Senior Hurling Championship =

Annual hurling competition season

- Dates: 26 August – October 2026
- Teams: 8
- Sponsor: UPMC
- Champions: Naas (14th title)
- Runners-up: Maynooth
- Relegated: Confey

Tournament statistics
- Matches played: 22

The 2026 Kildare Senior Hurling Championship is the 129th staging of the Kildare Senior Hurling Championship since its establishment by the Kildare County Board in 1888. The championship is due to run from 26 August to October 2026.

Naas entered the championship as the defending champions.

Record champion Clane returned to the senior championship for the first time since 2023.

Naas defended their title after beating Maynooth 3-13 to 0-11 in the final, claiming their 8th consecutive title and their 14th in total.

Confey was relegated ending their 24 years of consecutive Senior status.

== Team changes ==
=== To championship ===
Promoted from the Kildare Senior B Hurling Championship:

- Clane

=== From championship ===
Relegated to the Kildare Intermediate Hurling Championship:

- Moorefield

== Format changes ==
Compared to the previous format there is no more preliminary round. The 8 teams are split in 2 groups with 4 teams. Each team plays each other team in the group with 2 points for a win, 1 for a draw and 0 for a loss. The top 2 teams of each group qualify for the semi-finals, while the bottom 2 teams play the relegation play-offs.

The team losing both games in the relegation play-offs is now relegated to the Intermediate championship since the Senior B championship is discontinued.

== Group stage ==
The draw of the groups took place on the 8th of June 2026.

=== Group A ===
Semi-finalists Relegation play-offs

| Team | Matches | | | | Score | | | Points |
| Team | Pld | W | D | L | For | Against | Diff | Points |
|---|---|---|---|---|---|---|---|---|
| Maynooth | 3 | 3 | 0 | 0 | 98 | 52 | 46 | 6 |
| Éire Óg-Corrachoill | 3 | 2 | 0 | 1 | 57 | 53 | 4 | 4 |
| Coill Dubh | 3 | 1 | 0 | 2 | 51 | 71 | -20 | 2 |
| Confey | 3 | 0 | 0 | 3 | 45 | 75 | -30 | 0 |

=== Group A results ===
| 26 August Round 1 | Éire Óg-Corrachoill | 2-12 - 1-18 | Maynooth | Manguard Park |
| | | Report |

| 27 August Round 1 | Coill Dubh | 2-23 - 0-11 | Confey | Celbridge |
| | | Report |

| 12 September Round 2 | Coill Dubh | 0-17 - 1-19 | Éire Óg-Corrachoill | Cedral St Conleth's Newbridge |
| | | Report |

| 13 September Round 2 | Confey | 1-16 - 6-21 | Maynooth | Cedral St Conleth's Newbridge |
| | | Report |

| 27 September Round 3 | Coill Dubh | 1-12 - 5-23 | Maynooth | Cedral St Conleth's Newbridge |

| 27 September Round 3 | Confey | 0-15 - 0-17 | Éire Óg-Corrachoill | Manguard Park |

== Group B ==
=== Group B table ===
Semi-finalists Relegation play-offs

| Team | Matches | | | | Score | | | Points |
| Team | Pld | W | D | L | For | Against | Diff | Points |
|---|---|---|---|---|---|---|---|---|
| Naas | 3 | 3 | 0 | 0 | 145 | 27 | 118 | 6 |
| Celbridge | 3 | 2 | 0 | 1 | 68 | 86 | -18 | 4 |
| Ardclough | 3 | 1 | 0 | 2 | 60 | 82 | -22 | 2 |
| Clane | 3 | 0 | 0 | 3 | 49 | 127 | -78 | 0 |

=== Group B results ===
| 26 August Round 1 | Celbridge | 4-25 - 1-14 | Clane | Leixlip |
| | | Report |

| 27 August Round 1 | Ardclough | 0-12 - 2-28 | Naas | Manguard Park |
| | | Report |

| 11 September Round 2 | Ardclough | 2-19 - 0-23 | Clane | Manguard Park |
| | | Report |

| 13 September Round 2 | Celbridge | 0-06 - 5-31 | Naas | Cedral St Conleth's Newbridge |
| | | Report |

| 27 September Round 3 | Clane | 0-09 - 12-29 | Naas | Manguard Park |

| 27 September Round 3 | Ardclough | 2-17 - 1-22 | Celbridge | Cedral St Conleth's Newbridge |

== Knockout stage ==
=== Relegation Play-offs ===
| 10 October Semi-final | Clane | 1-15 - 3-17 | Coill Dubh | Manguard Park |

| 11 October Semi-final | Ardclough | 1-19 - 1-14 | Confey | Manguard Park |

| 23 October Final | Clane | 0-20 - 0-09 | Confey | Manguard Park |
| | | Report |

=== Semi-finals ===
| 11 October Semi-final | Éire Óg-Corrachoill | 0-06 - 4-32 | Naas | Cedral St Conleth's Newbridge |

| 11 October Semi-final | Celbridge | 1-16 - 4-14 | Maynooth | Cedral St Conleth's Newbridge |

=== Final ===
| 25 October Final | Maynooth | 0-11 - 3-13 | Naas | Cedral St Conleth's Newbridge |
| | | Report |
