= 2023 Kildare Senior Hurling Championship =

Annual hurling competition season

- Dates: 30 June – 15 October 2023
- Teams: 8
- Sponsor: UPMC
- Champions: Naas (11th title); Brian Byrne (captain); Tom Mullally (manager)
- Runners-up: Coill Dubh; Johnny Byrne (captain); Paddy Kelly (manager)
- Relegated: Clane

Tournament statistics
- Matches played: 20
- Goals scored: 55 (2.75 per match)
- Points scored: 601 (30.05 per match)
- Top scorer(s): Jack Sheridan (8-62)

The 2023 Kildare Senior Hurling Championship was the 126th staging of the Kildare Senior Hurling Championship since its establishment by the Kildare County Board in 1888. The group stage placings were confirmed on 3 July 2023. The championship ran from 30 June to 15 October 2023.

Naas entered the championship as the defending champions.

The final was played on 15 October 2023 at Manguard Park in Hawkfield, between Naas and Coill Dubh, in what was their first meeting in the final in four years. Naas won the match by 3–13 to 0–11 to claim their 11th championship title overall and a fifth title in succession.

Jack Sheridan was the championship's top scorer with 8-62.

== Qualifying stage ==
=== Preliminary round ===
30 June 2023 Preliminary round	Celbridge	0-13 - 1-22	Naas	Manguard Park
	L Quinn 0-5, P Leahy 0-3, G Keegan 0-2, C Kirwan 0-1, S Gleeson 0-1, A Goss 0-1.		J Sheridan 0-16, J Burke 1-2, C Sheridan 0-2, S Leacy 0-2.

2 July 2023 Preliminary round	Confey	1-09 - 5-16	Ardclough	Manguard Park
	B O'Boyle 1-2, F Bass 0-3, P Divilly 0-2, A Ryan 0-1, N Ryan 0-1.		E Walsh 3-2, S Whelan 0-8, M Small 2-0, M Fitzgerald 0-1, N Devane 0-1, J Reeves 0-1, P O'Malley 0-1, T Spain 0-1, C Burke 0-1.

2 July 2023 Preliminary round	Coill Dubh	1-18 - 1-12	Clane	Manguard Park
	M Delaney 1-9, D Brereton 0-3, J Byrne 0-3, O O'Sullivan 0-1, C Carew 0-1, K Brereton 0-1.		P McKenna 1-6, E Gillman 0-2, S Christanseen 0-1, S Donovan 0-1, S Healy 0-1, B Muldoon 0-1.

2 July 2023 Preliminary round	Maynooth	0-15 - 2-17	Éire Óg-Corrachoill	Manguard Park
	D Qualter 0-8, C McCabe 0-2, C Nolan 0-2, C Flanagan 0-2, R Dunne 0-1.		P Dolan 0-8, K Conor 1-1, S Cramer 1-0, R O'Neill 0-3, C Kielty 0-2, P Cribbin 0-1, G Johnson 0-1, C O'Reilly 0-1.

== Group A ==
=== Group A table ===
Semi-finalists Quarter-finalists

Team	Matches				Score			Pts
Team	Pld	W	D	L	For	Against	Diff	Pts
Naas	3	3	0	0	103	45	58	6
Coill Dubh	3	2	0	1	55	60	-5	4
Éire Óg-Corrachoill	3	1	0	2	55	64	-9	2
Ardclough	3	0	0	3	51	95	-44	0

=== Group A results ===
21 July 2023 Round 1	Coill Dubh	1-11 - 0-24	Naas	Manguard Park
	M Delaney 0-8, J Byrne 1-1, E O'Neill 0-1, D Bereton 0-1.		J Sheridan 0-11, J Burke 0-4, C Sheridan 0-3, B Byrne 0-2, C Dowling 0-1, K Whelan 0-1, S Leacy 0-1, F O'Sullivan 0-1.

22 July 2023 Round 1	Ardclough	2-11 - 2-16	Éire Óg-Corrachoill	Manguard Park
	M Small 1-1, E Walsh 1-1, S Whelan 0-4, P O'Malley 0-2, T Spain 0-2, M Fitzgerald 0-1.		P Dolan 0-9, S O'Neill 0-5, S Cramer 1-0, C O'Reilly 1-0, R O'Neill 0-1, K Connor 0-1.

12 August 2023 Round 2	Éire Óg-Corrachoill	2-11 - 1-15	Coill Dubh	Manguard Park
	R O'Neill 0-5, C O'Reilly 1-1, S O'Neill 1-0, G Johnson 0-2, M Begley 0-1, P Freeman 0-1, P Dolan 0-1.		M Delaney 0-8, J Kenny 1-0, D Bereton 0-2, C Carew 0-2, J Byrne 0-2, D Flaherty 0-1.

12 August 2023 Round 2	ARdclough	0-15 - 6-32	Naas	Manguard Park
	S Whelan 0-11, D Costello 0-2, T Spain 0-1, M Fitzgerald 0-1.		J Sheridan 4-13, J Burke 1-5, F O'Sullivan 0-4, K Aherne 1-0, K Whelan 0-3, B Byrne 0-2, Cian Boran 0-2, Conan Boran 0-1, C Sheridan 0-1, H Carroll 0-1.

1 September 2023 Round 3	Naas	4-17 - 0-16	Éire Óg-Corrachoill	Manguard Park
	J Sheridan 2-8, J Burke 1-1, K Aherne 1-1, R Boran 0-1, K Whelan 0-1, S Leacy 0-1, C Sheridan 0-1, C Boran 0-1, C Tobin 0-1, B Byrne 0-1.		P Dolan 0-12, C Byrne 0-1, N Cramer 0-1, R O'Neill 0-1, G Johnson 0-1.

1 September 2023 Round 3	Ardclough	1-16 - 3-14	Coill Dubh	Manguard Park
	S Whelan 0-11, T Spain 1-1, D Costello 0-1, P O'Malley 0-1, T McCarthy 0-1, J Reeves 0-1.		M Delaney 2-5, C Carew 0-5, R Casey 1-1, J Byrne 0-2, D Brereton 0-1.

== Group B ==
=== Group B table ===
Semi-finalists Quarter-finalists Relegated

Team	Matches				Score			Pts
Team	Pld	W	D	L	For	Against	Diff	Pts
Celbridge	3	3	0	0	53	41	12	6
Maynooth	3	2	0	1	73	37	36	4
Confey	3	1	0	2	37	70	-33	2
Clane	3	0	0	3	45	60	-15	0

=== Group B results ===
22 July 2023 Round 1	Clane	1-10 - 2-12	Celbridge	Manguard Park
	P McKenna 1-4, K Ahern 0-3, C Ryan 0-1, H Muldoon 0-1, E Gillman 0-1.		C Kirwan 1-2, G Keegan 0-4, P Leahy 1-0, J Dolan 0-3, L Quinn 0-1, A Shanagher 0-1, P Hogan 0-1.

22 July 2023 Round 1	Confey	0-05 - 5-20	Maynooth	Manguard Park
	F Bass 0-2, N Ryan 0-1, P Divilly 0-1, S Leamy 0-1.		D Qualter 0-10, C McCabe 2-2, A Jordan 2-2, D O'Meara 1-1, K Dunne 0-3, G Kenny 0-1, C Flanagan 0-1.

13 August 2023 Round 2	Confey	1-11 - 0-19	Celbridge	Manguard Park
	F Bass 0-6, S Lawless 1-0, P Divilly 0-3, P Quigley 0-1, E Lynch 0-1.		G Keegan 0-9, A Goss 0-2, A Shanagher 0-2, P Leahy 0-2, O Lynam 0-1, J Dolan 0-1, J Connolly 0-1, M Moloney 0-1.

13 August 2023 Round 2	Clane	1-13 - 3-15	Maynooth	Manguard Park
	P McKenna 0-7, S Healy 1-0, E Gillman 0-2, S Donovan 0-1, H Muldoon 0-1, C Bonus 0-1, S Christanseen 0-1.		D Qualter 3-8, C McCabe 0-2, K Dunne 0-1, C Flanagan 0-1, C Nolan 0-1, F Lohan 0-1, E Kelliher 0-1.

31 August 2023 Round 3	Confey	0-18 - 2-10	Clane	Manguard Park
	F Bass 0-10, E Lynch 0-2, P Divilly 0-2, A Ryan 0-1, C Chan 0-1, S Lawless 0-1, M Waldron 0-1.		P McKenna 1-7, S Healy 1-0, S Donovan 0-2, H Muldoon 0-1.

31 August 2023 Round 3	Celbridge	1-13 - 0-14	Maynooth	Manguard Park
	G Keegan 0-5, J Dolan 1-0, P Leahy 0-2, C Kirwan 0-2, L Quinn 0-1, S Gleeson 0-1, B White 0-1, A Doran 0-1.		D Qualter 0-8, C McCabe 0-2, A Jordan 0-2, D O'Meara 0-1, C Flanagan 0-1.

== Knockout stage ==
=== Quarter-final ===
16 September 2023 Quarter-final	Maynooth	1-20 - 2-16	Éire Óg-Corrachoill	Manguard Park
	D Qualter 0-13, C Nolan 1-0, D O'Meara 0-3, C McCabe 0-2, K Dunne 0-1, C Forde 0-1.		P Dolan 2-12, R O'Neill 0-1, C Kielty 0-1, K Connor 0-1, P Cribbin 0-1.

=== Semi-finals ===
30 September 2023 Semi-final	Celbridge	0-10 - 0-15	Coill Dubh	Manguard Park
	L Quinn 0-3, G Keegan 0-2, A Goss 0-1, P Leahy 0-1, A Shanagher 0-1, O Lynam 0-1, J Dolan 0-1.		M Delaney 0-6, R Casey 0-3, E O'Neill 0-2, C Gordon 0-1, D Flaherty 0-1, C Carew 0-1, J Byrne 0-1.

1 October 2023 Semi-final	Naas	0-21 - 0-15	Maynooth	Manguard Park
	J Sheridan 0-6, C Boran 0-4, B Byrne 0-3, J Burke 0-3, S Leacy 0-1, K Aherne 0-1, F O'Sullivan 0-1, C Dowling 0-1, C Boran 0-1.		D Qualter 0-12, A Jordan 0-2, H Dunne 0-1.

=== Final ===
15 October 2023 Final	Coill Dubh	0-11 - 3-13	Naas	Manguard Park
	M Delaney 0-4 (2fs, 1’65), C Carew 0-2 (1f), J Byrne 0-2 (1f), D Flaherty 0-2fs, E O’Neill 0-1.	Report	J Sheridan 2-8 (8fs), B Byrne 1-2, K Whelan 0-1, H Carroll 0-1, Cian Boran 0-1.	Referee: M Redmond

== Championship statistics ==
=== Top scorers ===
Overall

Rank	Player	Club	Tally	Total	Matches	Average
1	Jack Sheridan	Naas	8-62	86	6	14.33
2	David Qualter	Maynooth	3-59	68	6	11.33
3	Mark Delaney	Coill Dubh	3-40	49	6	8.16
4	Paul Dolan	Éire Óg-Corrachoill	2-42	48	5	9.60
5	Seán Whelan	Ardclough	0-34	34	4	8.50

In a single game

Rank	Player	Club	Tally	Total	Opposition
1	Jack Sheridan	Naas	4-13	25	Ardsclough
2	Paul Dolan	Éire Óg-Corrachoill	2-12	18	Maynooth
3	David Qualter	Maynooth	3-08	17	Clane
4	Jack Sheridan	Naas	0-16	16	Celbridge
5	Jack Sheridan	Naas	2-08	14	Éire Óg-Corrachoill
5	Jack Sheridan	Naas	2-08	14	Coill Dubh
7	David Qualter	Maynooth	0-13	13	Éire Óg-Corrachoill
8	Mark Delaney	Coill Dubh	1-09	12	Clane
8	Paul Dolan	Éire Óg-Corrachoill	0-12	12	Naas
8	David Qualter	Maynooth	0-12	12	Naas

=== Miscellaneous ===
- Naas win the clubs first five in a row.
- Naas are the first club to win five in a row since Ardclough between 1979 and 1983.
