= 2014 Kildare Senior Hurling Championship =

Annual hurling competition season

The 2014 Kildare Senior Hurling Championship was the 117th staging of the Kildare Senior Hurling Championship since its establishment by the Kildare County Board in 1888. The championship began on XXX and ended on 5 October 2014.

Celbridge were the defending champions, however, they failed to retain the title. Coill Dubh won the championship following a 3–11 to 0–16 defeat of Celbridge in the final.

== Results ==
=== Semi-finals ===
20 September 2014 Semi-final	Coill Dubh	0-13 - 0-14	Éire Óg-Corrachoill	Naas GAA Grounds
15:45				Referee: N Colgan

20 September 2014 Semi-final	Celbridge	2-20 - 0-13	Ardclough	Naas GAA Grounds
17:45				Referee: N Colgan

=== Final ===
5 October 2014 Final	Coill Dubh	3-11 - 0-16	Celbridge	St. Conleth's Park
16:00				Referee: B Cawley
