= Kildare Intermediate Hurling Championship =

Annual hurling competition for Intermediate clubs in Kildare

- Irish: Craobh Iomáint Idirmheánach Chill Dara
- Code: Hurling
- Region: Kildare (GAA)
- No. of teams: 6
- Title holders: Leixlip (1st title)
- Sponsors: UPMC
- Official website: Kildare GAA

The Kildare Intermediate Hurling Championship (known for sponsorship reasons as the UPMC Kildare Intermediate Hurling Championship and abbreviated to the Kildare IHC) is an annual hurling competition organised by the Kildare County Board of the Gaelic Athletic Association and contested by intermediate clubs in the county of Kildare in Ireland. It is the second tier overall in the entire Kildare hurling championship system.

In its current format, the Kildare Intermediate Championship begins with a group stage. The six participating teams play each other in a round-robin system. This is followed by a knockout phase that culminates with the final match at St Conleth's Park.

Leixlip are the title holders after Naas conceded the 2026 final.

== Format ==
=== Group stage ===
Over the course of the six-team group stage, each team plays once against the others in the group, resulting in each team being guaranteed at least five games. Two points are awarded for a win, one for a draw and zero for a loss. The teams are ranked in the group stage table by points gained, then scoring difference and then their head-to-head record. The top four teams from the group stage proceed to the knockout stage.

=== Knockout stage ===
Semi-finals: The top four teams from the group stage contest this round (1st v 4th and 2nd v 3rd). The two winners advance to the final.

Final: The two semi-final winners contest the final.

=== Promotion and relegation ===
At the end of the championship, the winning team is automatically promoted to the Kildare Senior Championship for the following season. The bottom-placed team from the group stage is automatically relegated to the Kildare Junior Championship.

== Teams ==
=== 2026 teams ===
In 2026 the Senior B Championship was discontinued. Its teams were transferred in the Intermediate Championship and the teams from the Intermediate Championship in 2025 to the 2026 Junior Championship.

The 6 teams competing in the 2026 Kildare Intermediate Hurling Championship are:

Team	Location	Colours	In championship since	Championship titles (since 2013)	Last championship title
Broadford	Allenwood	Maroon and white	2026	1	2022
Moorefield	Newbridge, County Kildare	Green and White	2026	0	—
Maynooth 2	Maynooth	Black and white	?	3	2021
Leixlip	Leixlip	Maroon and white	2026	1	2026
Naas 2	Naas	Blue and white	2026	8	2025
St Laurence's	Narraghmore	Amber and red	2026	0	—

== List of finals ==
=== List of Kildare IHC finals (2013–present) ===
Year	Winners		Runners-up		Venue	#
Year	Club	Score	Club	Score	Venue	#
2026	Leixlip	w/o	Naas	conceded		
2025	Naas	2-18	Maynooth	1-14		
2024	Naas	1–18	St Laurence's	0–08		
2023	Naas	0–21	Maynooth	1–17	Manguard Park	
2022	Broadford	0–21	Maynooth	0–10	Conneff Park	
2021	Maynooth	3–19	Naas	1–07	Conneff Park	
2020	Maynooth	2–15	Naas	0–18	St Conleth's Park	
2019	Naas	3–13	Maynooth	1–13	St Conleth's Park	
2018	Naas	0–15	Maynooth	1–10	St Conleth's Park	
2017	Naas	1–19	Maynooth	1–09	St Conleth's Park	
2016	Maynooth	2–13	Naas	1–09	Hawkfield Centre	
2015	Naas	3–14	Moorefield	2–10	Hawkfield Centre	
2014	Naas	2–11	Moorefield	1–10	St Conleth's Park	
2013	Celbridge	0–16	Sarsfields	1–08	St Conleth's Park	

== Roll of honour ==
=== Roll of honour (2013–present) ===
#	Club	Titles	Runners-up	Championships won	Championships runner-up
1	Naas	8	4	2014, 2015, 2017, 2018, 2019, 2023, 2024,2025	2016, 2020, 2021, 2026
2	Maynooth	3	5	2016, 2020, 2021	2017, 2018, 2019, 2022, 2023, 2025
3	Celbridge	1	0	2013	—
3	Broadford	1	0	2022	—
3	Leixlip	1	0	2026	—
6	Moorefield	0	2	—	2014, 2015
6	Sarsfields	0	1	—	2013
6	St Laurence's	0	1	—	2024

== See also ==
- Kildare Senior Hurling Championship (Tier 1)
- Kildare Senior B Hurling Championship (Discontinued tier 2 between 2022-2025)
- Kildare Junior Hurling Championship (Tier 3)
