= 2022 Kildare Senior Hurling Championship =

Annual hurling competition season

- Dates: 25 June – 25 September 2022
- Teams: 8
- Sponsor: UPMC
- Champions: Naas (10th title); Brian Byrne (captain); Tom Mullally (manager)
- Runners-up: Maynooth; Mick Gillick (captain); Tom Walsh (manager)

The 2022 Kildare Senior Hurling Championship was the 125th staging of the Kildare Senior Hurling Championship since its establishment by the Kildare County Board in 1888. The preliminary round draw took place on 25 May 2022. The championship ran from 25 June to 25 September 2022.

Naas entered the championship as the defending champions.

The final was played on 25 September 2022 at St Conleth's Park in Newbridge, between Naas and Maynooth, in what was their first ever meeting in the final. Naas won the match by 0–20 to 0–12 to claim their 10th championship title overall and a fourth title in succession.

== Knockout stage ==
=== Quarter-final ===
28 August 2022 Quarter-final	Clane	2-13 - 0-17	Confey	St Conleth's Park

=== Semi-finals ===
11 September 2022 Semi-final	Maynooth	0-17 - 0-15	Celbridge	St Conleth's Park

11 September 2022 Semi-final	Naas	3-20 - 0-12	Clane	St Conleth's Park

=== Final ===
25 September 2022 Final	Naas	0-20 - 0-12	Maynooth	St Conleth's Park
	J Burke 0-10 (10 frees), J Sheridan 0-3 (1 s), S Leacy 0-2, C Dowling 0-2, R Boran 0-1, P O'Donoghue 0-1, C Sheridan 0-1.	Report	D Qualter 0-8 (6fs), C McCabe 0-2, A Jordan 0-1, C Flanagan 0-1.	Referee: B Kearney
