= Kildare Senior Football League Division 1 =

Kildare Senior Football League Division 1 is an annual Gaelic football competition contested by the Kildare GAA clubs. As of 2017, 12 clubs play 11 games and are awarded 2 points per win and 1 point per draw. The top two teams qualify to play in the League Final, the winner is presented with the "Leinster Leader Cup".

== Finals listed by year ==
Year	Winner	Score	Opponent	Score
2024	Naas	1-14	Sarsfields	0-09
2023	Naas	1-13	Sarsfields	0-14
2022	Naas	1-13	Athy	0-12
2021	Raheens	3-16	Sarsfields	2-18
2020	No competition due to the impact of the COVID-19 pandemic on Gaelic games			
2019	Naas	1-21	Carbury	1-17
2018	Athy	0-13	Moorefield	0-10
2017	Moorefield	2-14	Naas	0-16
2016	Confey	1-08	Athy	0-08
2015	Moorefield	3-13	Sarsfields	0-12
2014	Celbridge	1-10	Athy	1-08
2013	Moorefield	2-15	Confey	1-13
2012	Sarsfields	2-15	Celbridge	2-09
2011	Moorefield	1-10	Sarsfields	0-09
2010	Moorefield	1-09	St Laurence's	1-07
2009	St Laurence's	2-10	Moorefield	1-12
2008	Moorefield	0-13	Celbridge	0-04
2007	Sarsfields	1-12	Carbury	0-12
2006	Rathangan	0-10	Clane	0-08
2005	St Laurence's		Leixlip	
2004	Allenwood	2-09	Moorefield	1-10
2003	Kilcock	1-09	Allenwood	0-05
2002	Allenwood	0-11	Leixlip	1-06
2001	Kilcullen		Moorefield	
2000	St Laurence's		Moorefield	
1999	Leixlip	3-06	Allenwood	1-09
1998	Leixlip	0-13	Allenwood	1-07
1997	Clane		Leixlip	
1996				
1995				
1994				
