= David Qualter =

Irish hurler

Personal information
- Native name: Daithí Mac Ualtair (Irish)
- Born: 2002 (age 23–24) Maynooth, County Kildare, Ireland
- Occupation: Student

Sport
- Sport: Hurling
- Position: Right corner-forward
Club
- Years: Club
- Maynooth
Club titles
- Kildare titles: 0
College
- Years: College
- DCU Dóchas Éireann
College titles
- Fitzgibbon titles: 0
Inter-county*
| Years | County | Apps (scores) |
| 2022- | Kildare | 0 (0-00) |
Inter-county titles
- Leinster titles: 0
- All-Irelands: 0
- NHL: 0
- All Stars: 0
- *Inter County team apps and scores correct as of 14:52, 19 February 2022.

David Qualter (born 2002) is an Irish hurler who plays for Kildare Senior Championship club Maynooth and at inter-county level with the Kildare senior hurling team.

== Career ==
Qualter played hurling at juvenile and underage levels with Maynooth GAA club. After winning a Kildare MAHC title in 2020, he went on to win a Kildare IHC title after a defeat of Naas in the final. Qualter first appeared on the inter-county scene as a member of the Kildare minor hurling team in 2019 and ended the season as the team's top scorer with 8-37. He progressed onto the Kildare under-20 team and joined the Kildare senior team for the 2021 National League.

== Career statistics ==
As of 13 February 2022

| Team | Year | National League | | | Ring Cup | | Total | |
| Team | Year | Division | Apps | Score | Apps | Score | Apps | Score |
|---|---|---|---|---|---|---|---|---|
| Kildare | 2021 | Division 2A | 2 | 1-08 | 0 | 0-00 | 2 | 1-08 |
| Career total | | | 2 | 1-08 | 0 | 0-00 | 2 | 1-08 |

== Honours ==
Maynooth

- Kildare Intermediate Hurling Championship: 2020
- Kildare Minor A Hurling Championship: 2020
