= Pat Dunney =

Irish Gaelic football player and hurler

Personal information
- Native name: Pádraig Ó Dúnaigh (Irish)
- Born: 1945 (age 80–81) Prosperous, County Kildare, Ireland
- Occupation: Development manager
- Height: 5 ft 8 in (173 cm)

Sport
- Football Position: Centre-forward
- Hurling Position: Centre-back
Clubs
- Years: Club
- Raheens; Éire Óg-Corrachoill
Club titles
	Football	Hurling
Kildare titles	7	10
Leinster titles	1	0
Inter-county
- Years: County
- 1962–1979: Kildare
Inter-county titles
	Football	Hurling
Leinster Titles	0	0
All-Ireland Titles	0	0
League titles	0	0
All-Stars	0	0

Patrick Dunney (born 1945) is an Irish former hurler, Gaelic footballer and Gaelic games administrator. At club level, he played with Raheens and Éire Óg-Corrachoill and at inter-county level he lined out as a dual player with various Kildare teams.

== Playing career ==
Dunney's 30-year club career as a dual player began at juvenile level in 1955. As a hurler with Éire Óg-Corrachoill he won ten Kildare SHC medals between 1964 and 1984. Dunney also won seven Kildare SFC medals with Raheens, while he also claimed a Leinster Club SFC medal when Raheens became the first Kildare club to win the competition.

At inter-county level, Dunney was just 17-year-old when he won an All-Ireland JHC medal with Kildare in 1962. He later captained the Kildare under-21 team to consecutive Leinster U21FC titles, as well as their inaugural All-Ireland U21FC title in 1965. Dunney added a second All-Ireland JHC medal to his collection after beating Warwickshire in the 1966 All-Ireland junior final. An All-Ireland IHC medal followed in 1969, having earlier claimed the Division 2 league title.

Dunney's career with the Kildare senior football team saw him lose six leinster SFC finals between 1966 and 1978. He was also part of the Kildare senior hurling team that won the inaugural All-Ireland SBHC title in 1974.

As a member of the Leinster inter-provincial team in both codes, Dunney won four Railway Cup medals as a hurler in a five-year period between 1971 and 1975. He became one of the few players to claim winners' medals in both codes when he added a Railway Cup football medal to his collection in 1974.

== Administrative career ==
Dunney became involved in the administrative affairs of the GAA following his retirement from playing. He was his club's hurling board delegate, before later serving as vice-chairman and then chairman of that board. Dunney was also chairman of the Kildare County Board for eight years and was also Kildare's Central Council delegate. He was also a selector, under Mick O'Dwyer, when Kildare were beaten by Galway in the 1998 All-Ireland final. Dunney was named on both of Kildare's Millennium Teams in 2000. He was also chairman of the Hurling Development Committee responsible for introducing the Christy Ring Cup, Nicky Rackard Cup and Lory Meagher Cup competitions.

== Honours ==
=== Player ===
Raheens

- Leinster Senior Club Football Championship: 1981
- Kildare Senior Football Championship: 1964, 1968, 1973, 1976, 1978, 1979, 1981

Éire Óg-Corrachoill

- Kildare Senior Hurling Championship: 1964, 1965, 1966, 1967, 1969, 1970, 1971, 1972, 1977, 1984

Kildare

- All-Ireland Senior B Hurling Championship: 1974
- All-Ireland Intermediate Hurling Championship: 1969
- Leinster Intermediate Hurling Championship: 1969
- All-Ireland Junior Hurling Championship: 1962, 1966
- Leinster Junior Hurling Championship: 1962, 1966
- National Hurling League Division 2: 1968–69
- All-Ireland Under-21 Football Championship: 1965 (c)
- Leinster Under-21 Football Championship: 1965 (c), 1966 (c)

Leinster

- Railway Cup (F): 1974
- Railway Cup (H): 1971, 1972, 1974, 1975

=== Selector ===
Kildare

- Leinster Senior Football Championship: 1998

Sporting positions
Preceded by	Kildare senior football team captain 1969	Succeeded by
Achievements
Preceded by Dom O'Donnell	All-Ireland Under-21 Football Final winning captain 1965	Succeeded by Colm Shine
