= Broadford GAA =

Hurling/camogie club in County Kildare, Ireland

Broadford
- Gearr Eiscir
- Founded: 1923
- County: Kildare
- Colours: Maroon and White
- Grounds: Balrinnet, Nurney, County Kildare
- Coordinates: 53.390521°N 6.996789°W

Playing kits
Standard colours

Senior Club Championships
	All Ireland	Leinster champions	Kildare champions
Hurling:	0	0	2
Camogie:	0	0	16

Broadford is a Gaelic Athletic Association (GAA) club in County Kildare, Ireland, winners of two senior hurling and 16 senior camogie titles. It enlists players from a radius of twenty miles from the Boyne bridge in Edenderry, Leinster bridge in Clonard, Blackwater bridge in Enfield and Barney Bridge in Allenwood. Mick Moore was selected at full-forward on the Kildare hurling team of the millennium.

== History ==
Balyna (described in 1908 as the only purely hurling club in the county) and Moyvalley were affiliated in 1907. Garriskar also competed in the 1910s and Johnstownbridge in the 1920s and 1930s. Broadford affiliated in 1923 but had been in existence for three years beforehand, winning a gold medal tournament in Meath with seven Bourkes on the team. Patsy Loughrey was one of the founding fathers, and Father James organised a house to house collection that yielded IR£2 10s. for the club's first set of jerseys. Dermot Bourke, brother of dual All Ireland medalist Frank, was responsible for re-organising the club after it regarded junior in 1950. Bourke played for 34 years before collecting a county medal in 1960, scoring one of Broadford’s goals in the final.

== Gaelic Football ==
Broadford hurlers play Gaelic football with Clogherinkoe, Johnstownbridge or Carbury.

== Hurling ==
The club were beaten in 11 county finals before they won the double in 1960 and 1961 defeating Military College on home ground in Thomastown. Fourteen Carbury natives fielded with Broadford while Military College had five inter-county players and no Kildare natives. Broadford won by 3-2 to 1-5. Joe Costigan, Pat and John Cummins, Ted Duffy and John Ennis were all participants in the victory. Broadford repeated the act a year later, when they beat their predecessors as county champions, Athy, by three points.

== Camogie ==
Founded in 1967, the club dominated camogie in Kildare between 1978 and 1993, beating Carbury 10-15 to nil in the 1991 final and winning Leinster junior club title in 1987. In all they won 16 senior and two junior championships. Miriam Malone-Miggin is considered the county’s greatest camogie player.

== Honours ==
- Kildare Senior Hurling Championship Winners (2) 1960, 1961
- Kildare Senior Hurling Championship Finalist 1925, 1936, 1934, 1942, 1944, 1957, 1958, 1963, 1984, 1989
- Kildare Senior Hurling League: (1) 1988
- Kildare Junior/Intermediate Hurling Championship (6) 1939, 1956, 1976, 1981, 1987, 2002
- Kildare Junior Hurling Championship Finalists (9) 1950, 1952, 1953, 1955, 1962, 1969, 1970, 1972, 1973, 1987
- Kildare Junior Hurling League (3) 1974, 1976, 1981

- Kildare Senior Camogie Championship (16) 1969, 1970, 1971, 1973, 1979, 1982, 1983, 1984, 1985, 1986, 1987, 1988, 1989, 1990, 1991,1993
- Kildare Senior Camogie League (14) 1968, 1969, 1970, 1971, 1972, 1973, 1980, 1982, 1983, 1987, 1988, 1992, 1993
- Kildare Junior Camogie Championship (1) 1967
- Leinster Junior Camogie Championship (1) 1987
- Kildare girls Junior champions (1) 2008

== Bibliography ==
- Kildare GAA: A Centenary History, by Eoghan Corry, CLG Chill Dara, 1984, ISBN 0-9509370-0-2 hb ISBN 0-9509370-1-0 pb
- Kildare GAA yearbook, 1972, 1974, 1978, 1979, 1980 and 2000- in sequence especially the Millennium yearbook of 2000
- Soaring Sliothars: Centenary of Kildare Camogie 1904-2004 by Joan O'Flynn Kildare County Camogie Board.
