= Kildare Under 21 Football Championship =

The Kildare Under 21 Football Championship is an annual Gaelic football competition contested by the Kildare GAA clubs. This is a knockout competition restricted to players who are under the age of 21 on 1 January of the competition year.

== Finals listed by year ==
Year	Winner	Opponent
2020	Not played due to Covid	
2019	Naas 2-12	Celbridge 1-09
2018	Clane 2-21	Naas 1-21
2017	Sarsfields 2-14	Athy 2-06
2016	Naas 0-07	Moorefield 0-06
2015	Balyna 1-08	Athy 0-10
2014	Celbridge 1-18	Castledermot 1-10
2013	Sarsfields 0-15	Balyna 1-09
2012	Celbridge 1-12	Castledermot 1-10
2011	Athy 2-10	Naas 2-05
2010	Athy 1-11	Clane 1-08
2009	Balyna	St Laurence's
2008	Na Fianna 2-06	Balyna 1-07
2007	Sarsfields 0-11	St Laurence's 0-09
2006	Round Towers 1-08	Sarsfields 0-08
2005	Celbridge 1-09, 0-17 (R)	Na Fianna 1-09, 1-10 (R) aet
2004	St Laurence's 1-14	Confey 2-09
2003	Moorefield 1-11	Confey 0-05
2002		
2001	N.U.I. Maynooth 5-11	Confey 0-04
2000	Moorefield 0-10	N.U.I. Maynooth 0-09
1999	St. Cocas	Leixlip
1998	Moorefield	
1997	Moorefield	
1996	Leixlip	
