= Military College GAA =

Gaelic games club in County Kildare, Ireland

Military College GAA was a prominent participant in County Kildare GAA competition, significant in Kildare GAA history. They won the Kildare Senior Football Championship in 1956 and the Kildare Senior Hurling Championship in 1957, 1958 and 1962.
