= Confey GAA =

Irish Gaelic Athletic Association club

- Confaí
- Founded: 1989
- County: Kildare
- Grounds: Creighton Park, Confey, Leixlip
- Coordinates: 53.374829°N 6.482706°W

Playing kits
Standard colours

Senior Club Championships
	All Ireland	Leinster champions	Kildare champions
Hurling:	0	0	3

Confey GAA is a Gaelic Athletic Association (GAA) club based in Leixlip, County Kildare, Ireland, and won Kildare's Club of the Year award in 2004.

== History ==
On 19 January 1989, a meeting was held in the home of Michael Divilly for those who were interested in creating a separate GAA club for the northern half of Leixlip in the parish of Confey. At this meeting it was agreed to hold a public meeting to gain further support for the foundation of a new club, which was subsequently held in the local school on 30 January. Following this meeting a formal approach was made to the Kildare County board, and Confey was formally registered as a club on 27 February 1989. The club's first official match came in March, with the men's football team losing to Cappagh on a scoreline of 2–3 to 2–2. The club acquired six and a half acres at Cope Bridge in 1990, followed by a further three and a half acres the following year. The club's first chairman was Pat Sweeney. In 1998 the club opened a new clubhouse, with a bar, sportshall, and several dressing rooms. The club's facilities at Cope Bridge are named Creaton Park in memory of Jimmy Creaton who was one of the founding members of the club and club chairman in 1990 and 1991.

== Gaelic football ==
Confey's first title at adult football level came in 1995 when the Confey under 21 footballers beat Maynooth to claim the 1995 Kildare Under 21 Football B Championship. Confey footballers were promoted to Kildare Senior Football League Division – 2 in 1999 and gained promotion to division 1 in 2001. 2002 saw Confey minor (Under 18) footballers winning the 2002 Kildare Minor Football Championship beating Celbridge in a replayed final after a drawn first game, the senior footballer also claimed the club first title at that level by winning the 2002 Kildare Junior Football "Keogh" Cup. Confey won the Kildare Junior Football Championship in 2003 beating Nurney in the final which made up for being relegated from the division 1 league. Confey won the 2004 Senior Football League Division – 2 beating Rathangan 0–7 v 0–6 in Clane. In 2006 Confey won the Kildare Intermediate Football Championship v St. Kevin's and went on to beat Tubber (Offaly) in the 2006 Leinster GAA Intermediate Club Championship Final. Confey won the 2008 Kildare Senior Football "Aldridge" Cup beating Sarsfields in the final. 2009 saw the footballers relegated from the senior to intermediate grade after a one-point loss to Naas in a relegation playoff. 2012 saw the team return to the senior grade as a result of winning the 2011 Kildare Intermediate Football Championship, beating Ellistown in the final. In 2013 the senior footballers reached the final of the 2013 Kildare Senior Football League Division 1 only to lose out on the day to Moorefield. In 2016 Confey Senior Footballers won the Kildare Senior Division 1 League beating Athy 1–08 to 0–8. They currently compete in Division 1.

== Hurling ==
The club formed its first adult team in March 1993. In its first year the adult men's team reached the junior hurling league semi-final and captured the Junior 'B' hurling championship, defeating Moorefield on a scoreline of 0–13 to 1–5. In 1997 the club won the S.H.L. Div. 2 title, defeating Clane 3–11 to 1–7. The club had to wait until 2002 to capture its next adult hurling titles when the club, led by captain Alfie Keenahan, won both the Intermediate League and Championship. The club has competed in the Senior Hurling championship ever since. In 2005 Confey lost to Celbridge in the semi-final, the furthest the team had reached in the competition to that point. The following year they were finalists, but were defeated by Ardclough. The club won its first Senior County Hurling Title in 2007, defeating Coill Dubh 3–8 to 0–10. The team was captained by Kieran Divilly, and man of the match was Oisin Lynch who scored 0–5 on the day. The team in 2007 was managed by Liam Dowd, who was aided by selectors Tony Hoare and Eamon Fennelly and 'special advisors' Davy Fitzgerald and Bertie Sherlock. Confey added a second Kildare Senior Hurling Championship in 2008 beating Coill Dubh in the final while also adding their first senior hurling league division 1 title. Confey won the 2012 Kildare Senior Hurling Championship, their third, beating Celbridge in the final avenging the previous years final defeat to the same team. 2014 saw Confey beat Éire Óg-Chorrachoill in the Senior Hurling League Final. The club fielded a second adult team for the first time in 2004 and in their first year they captured the Junior hurling league and championship. Since then the club's second team play in the Intermediate league and championship.

== Camogie ==
Confey fielded their first under-12 team in 1994 and have participated at most under-age level..Their facility at Cope Bridge was opened on 16 May 1998.

== Ladies Football ==
Confey qualified for the All Ireland intermediate club final in 2000, losing to Rockchapel of Cork. They won two Kildare club championships in succession.

== Honours ==
Adult football

- Leinster Intermediate Club Football Championship: Winners: 2006
- Kildare Intermediate Football Championship: Winners: 2006, 2011
- Kildare Intermediate Football Championship: Runner-up: 2004, 2010
- Junior 'A' Football Championship Winners: 2003 Runner-Up 2001
- Kildare Senior Football League Division 1 Winners: 2016 Runners-Up 2013
- Kildare Senior Football League Division 2 Winners: 2004 Runner Up: 2001, 2010
- Kildare Senior Football League Division 3 Runner-up: 1996
- Kildare Senior Football "Aldridge" Cup Winners (1) 2008
- Kildare Junior Football "Keogh" Cup Winners (1) 2002
- Jack Higgins Cup Winners (1) 2003
- Kildare Senior Football Reserve – B Championship: (1) 2015
- Kildare Senior Football Reserve – B Championship Runner Up: 2016
- Kildare Senior Football Reserve – C Championship: (1) 2014
- Kildare Intermediate Football B Championship Winners: 2006
- Kildare Intermediate Football B Championship Runner-up: 2006
- Kildare Senior Football League Division 4 Winners: 2007, 2012
- Kildare Senior Football League Division 4 (North) Winners: 2012
- Kildare Senior Football League Division 4 (North) Runner Up: 2015
- Kildare Senior Football League Division 4 Runner Up: 2008,
- Kildare Junior Football League Division 2 Winners: 1998
- Kildare Junior Football C Championship: (1) 2004
- Under 21 Football A Championship Runner-up: 2001 2003 2004
- Kildare Under-21 Football B Championship Winners: 1995
- Kildare Minor 'A' Football Championship Winners: 2002
- Kildare Minor 'B' Football Championship Runner Up: 1992, 2013
- Kildare Minor Football League Division – 1 Winners: 2002, 2003
- Kildare Minor Football League Division – 4 Winners: 1994, 1996
- Kildare Minor Football League Div. 4 Winners: 1994

Adult hurling

- Kildare Senior Hurling Championship Winners 2007, 2008, 2012
- Kildare Senior Hurling Championship: Runner-up 2006 2011 2020
- Kildare Senior Hurling League Division 1 Winners 2008, 2014, 2018, 2021
- Kildare Senior Hurling League Division 2 Winners 1997
- Kildare Senior Hurling League Division 4 Winners 2023
- Kildare Intermediate Hurling Championship (1) 2002
- Kildare Intermediate Hurling B Championship (1) 2013
- Kildare Intermediate Hurling League (2) 2002, 2013
- Kildare Junior Hurling Championship (3) 1993, 2004, 2024
- Kildare Junior Hurling League (1) 2004
- Kildare Under 21 Hurling Championship (2) 2004, 2008
- Kildare Minor Hurling Championship Winners 2003
- Kildare Minor Hurling Championship Runner-up 2011
- Kildare Minor Hurling B Championship Winners 1998
- Kildare Minor Hurling B Championship Runner Up 2016 (St. Columba's (Confey & Leixlip))
- Kildare Minor Hurling League Division 1 Winners 2002, 2003, 2004
- Kildare Minor Hurling League Division – 2 Winners 2013 (St. Columba's (Confey & Leixlip))

Ladies football

- Leinster Club Ladies Intermediate Football Championship: (1) 2000
- Kildare Ladies Junior Football Championship: (1) 1999
- Kildare Ladies Senior Football Championship: (2) 2009, 2012
- Kildare Ladies Intermediate Football Championship: (2) 2000, 2005
- Kildare Ladies Junior Football Championship: (1) 1999
- Kildare Ladies Senior Football League Division 1 Winners (2) 2012, 2016
- Kildare Ladies Minor Football League Division 1 Winners (3) 2000, 2001, 2002

== See also ==
- Davy Burke

== Bibliography ==
- Kildare GAA: A Centenary History, by Eoghan Corry, CLG Chill Dara, 1984, ISBN 0-9509370-0-2 hb ISBN 0-9509370-1-0 pb
- Kildare GAA yearbook, 1972, 1974, 1978, 1979, 1980 and 2000– in sequence especially the Millennium yearbook of 2000
- Soaring Sliothars: Centenary of Kildare Camogie 1904–2004 by Joan O'Flynn Kildare County Camogie Board.
