= Kildare Senior B Hurling Championship =

Annual hurling competition for senior clubs in Kildare

- Irish: Craobh Iomáint Shinsir B Chill Dara
- Code: Hurling
- Founded: 2022; 4 years ago
- Region: Kildare (GAA)
- No. of teams: 6
- Title holders: Clane (1st title)
- Sponsors: UPMC
- Official website: Kildare GAA

The Kildare Senior B Hurling Championship (known for sponsorship reasons as the UPMC Kildare Senior B Hurling Championship and abbreviated to the Kildare SBHC) was an annual hurling competition organised by the Kildare County Board of the Gaelic Athletic Association for the second tier hurling teams in County Kildare in Ireland.

In its current format, the Kildare Senior B Championship begins with a group stage. The six participating teams play each other in a round-robin system. This is followed by a knockout phase that culminates with the final match at St Conleth's Park. The winner of the Kildare Senior B Championship qualifies for the subsequent Leinster Junior Club Championship.

Clane are the title holders after defeating Leixlip by 1–18 to 1–17 in the 2025 final.

In 2026 the Senior B Championship is discontiniued and named Intermediate Hurling Championship instead.

== Format ==
=== Group stage ===
Over the course of the six-team group stage, each team plays once against the others in the group, resulting in each team being guaranteed at least five games. Two points are awarded for a win, one for a draw and zero for a loss. The teams are ranked in the group stage table by points gained, then scoring difference and then their head-to-head record. The top four teams from the group stage proceed to the knockout stage.

=== Knockout stage ===
Semi-finals: The top four teams from the group stage contest this round (1st v 4th and 2nd v 3rd). The two winners advance to the final.

Final: The two semi-final winners contest the final.

=== Promotion and relegation ===
At the end of the championship, the winning team is automatically promoted to the Kildare Senior Championship for the following season. The bottom-placed team from the group stage is automatically relegated to the Kildare Intermediate Championship.

== Teams ==
=== 2025 teams ===
Team	Location	Colours	In championship since	Championship titles	Last championship title
Broadford	Allenwood	Maroon and white		0	—
Clane	Clane	White	2024	0	—
Kilcock	Kilcock	Green and gold		0	—
Leixlip	Leixlip	Maroon and white	2025	1	2023
Naas	Naas	Blue and white		0	—
St Laurence's	Narraghmore	Amber and red	2025	0	—

== Qualification for subsequent competitions ==
At the end of the championship, the winning team qualify to the subsequent Leinster Junior Club Hurling Championship.

== List of finals ==
=== List of Kildare SBHC finals ===
Year	Winners		Runners-up		Venue	#
Year	Club	Score	Club	Score	Venue	#
2025	Clane	1–18	Leixlip	1-17	St. Conleths Park	
2024	Naas	1–21	Moorefield	0-17	Manguard Park	
2023	Leixlip	1–16	Naas	2-08	Manguard Park	
2022	Éire Óg-Corrachoill	3–16	Naas	1–11	St Conleth's Park	

== Roll of honour ==
=== By club ===
#	Team	Titles	Runners-up	Championships won	Championships runners-up
1	Naas	1	2	2024	2022, 2023
1	Clane	1	0	2025	—
1	Éire Óg-Corrachoill	1	0	2022	—
1	Leixlip	1	0	2023	—
4	Moorefield	0	1	—	2024

== See also ==
- Kildare Senior Hurling Championship (Tier 1)
- Kildare Intermediate Hurling Championship (Tier 3)
