= Éire Óg-Corrachoill CLG =

Gaelic games club in County Kildare, Ireland

Éire Óg Corra Choill Hurling Club
- Founded: 1994
- County: Kildare
- Colours: Maroon and yellow
- Grounds: Donore, Caragh
- Coordinates: 53.259797°N 6.732817°W

Playing kits
Standard colours

Senior Club Championships
	All Ireland	Leinster champions	Kildare champions
Hurling:	0	0	10
Camogie:	-	0	10

Éire Óg-Corrachoill (Irish pronunciation: [ˈeːɾʲə ˈoːɡ ˈkɔɾˠəxəl̠ʲ]; "Young Ireland-Prosperous") is a hurling club based in the parish of Caragh in County Kildare. The parish of Caragh includes the village of Caragh itself, surrounding townlands and Prosperous village which is situated about 3 km north-west from the village. The club is the result of an amalgamation which occurred in 1994 between Éire Óg of Caragh and Corra Choill of Prosperous. The first record of any kind of success in the Caragh parish area involves the Clongorey Campaigners. RIC records from 1890 show that Clongorey Campaigners had 38 members with Dan Kelly, John Murphy, Pat Fullam and James Kelly listed as officers. Clongorey reached the Senior Hurling Championship final in 1891 and but were defeated by Maynooth. Their home ground is in donore just opposite the motor racing circuit Mondello Park.

== History of Corra Choill ==
Hurling was introduced to Prosperous in the mid 70s. The team played under the name of Caragh and played their home games at St. Farnans Park. Caragh won its first league title in 1983 and in 1984 won their first Junior championship and were also successful in retaining their league title. The hurling club changed its name to Corra Choill hurling club in the mid 80s. The club won its first Intermediate Championship title as Corra Choill in 1988. Corra Choill moved to the playing pitches of the secondary school in the village in the 90s. The club had considerable underage success in the early 90s with the under 12 team falling to a defeat after a replay against Confey GAA in the Championship and the Under 13 team winning the league.

The amalgamation of both clubs was somewhat controversial in Corra Choill. A portion of the club membership at the time was against it and tried to set up a separate club in Prosperous carrying out underage training at the primary school in Prosperous. Some adult and underage players left the club joining Coill Dubh GAA, Ardclough GAA and Clane GAA with some deciding to turn their backs on the game of hurling altogether. Some of those that left the game of hurling did eventually rejoin their new and old Éire Óg Corra Choill teammates .

== Camogie in Prosperous and Caragh ==
It is not certain when camogie was first played in Prosperous. There is little doubt that camogie was played in Kildare soon after the sport was first organised in 1904. Although records are sparse Newbridge, Naas, Blacktrench, Prosperous and Ballymore applied unsuccessfully for affiliation to Kildare GAA board in 1921. Kildare sent delegates to the camogie congress of 1932, and a county board was formed in 1934 with Father Byrne C.C. of Caragh as president.

Camogie was reorganised at a county convention in 1954, and has been played in Kildare continuously since. It was introduced to Caragh GAA in 1955. The team played in the colours grey and red. Caragh won the county championship in 1958 but were not able to field a team again until 1962. The Camogie team was reorganised by Betty Garry in 1962. They won the senior league in 1964 and senior championship and league in 1965 and again in 1966. They were defeated in the 1967 camogie county championship by Geraldines 5–0 to 4–2. Many of Clane GAA best players joined Prosperous in 1983 resulting in the side lapsing. The history of Camogie in Prosperous from 1967 to 1983 and again to present day is uncertain. But under the name of Prosperous camogie club they won the Championship in 1972, 1974, 1975, 1976, 1977, 1980, 1981. League success was also enjoyed in 1974, 1975, 1976, 1977, 1981, 1984, 1985, 1986.

== Éire Óg ==
The club won its First Intermediate in 1960 and enjoyed a great period of dominance in Kildare Senior Hurling Championship spanning from 1964 to 1977 winning 9 of the 11 finals they were in. On two occasions they were denied a five in a row by Ardclough GAA who won the Senior Championship themselves 4 times in the same period (Suncroft denied Ardclough a four in a row in 1974). The club won their second Intermediate championship in 1975. They were to endure a barren spell reaching the Championship final in 1984 and winning but losing in 1987 and 1990 to Coill Dubh on both occasions and again in 1992 this time losing to Castledermot GAA and suffering defeat once more to Coill Dubh in 1993.

== Éire Óg Corra Choill ==
=== Hurling ===
Éire Óg Corra Choill won its first Intermediate Championship title in 1996. In 1999 the club reached its first Senior hurling championship final. However they were defeated by Coill Dubh GAA 1–14 to 1–6. The Minor team won the Minor B Hurling Championship Final defeating St. Patrick's 4–21 to 1–05 in 2008.

=== Camogie ===
In 2006 Éire Óg Corra Choill Camogie Club was formed. An under thirteen team gathered under Tanya Johnson, assisted by Tom Kenny and Liz Roche on 24 August 2006. The founding Committee consisted of Mary Johnson as president, Jim Kennedy (Chairman), Tom Kenny (Vice-chairman), Liz Roche (Secretary), Maree Byrne, Martina Campbell (Joint Treasurers), Eunice Lavelle (Public Relations Officer), Jane Begley (Registrar), Mary Johnson, Nicole Dempsey (Child Officers). The club currently cater from Under 7 to Under 13 level. Pat Dunney was appointed as team manager to the Kildare camogie county team. The Éire Óg-Corrachoill Camogie Under 13 team won Division 4 of the league.

== Teams of the Millennium ==
Éire Óg and Prosperous camogie clubs both had players named on their respective Teams of the Millennium. Pat Dunney was the only player chose for both the Kildare football and hurling teams of the millennium, one of two players to play hurling and football for Leinster on the same day, a Cuchulainn All Stars Award winner in 1967 and later chairman of Kildare GAA county board.

=== Hurling Team of the Millennium ===
- Pat Dunney (Éire Óg)
- Mick Mullins (Éire Óg)

=== Camogie Team of the Century ===
- Geraldine Dwyer (Athy, Prosperous & Clane)
- Teresa Lynch (Rathcoffey & Prosperous)
- Nuala Malone (Rathcoffey & Prosperous)
- Eileen Reilly (Rathcoffey & Prosperous)
- Marianne Johnson (Prosperous & Clane)

== Honours ==
=== Hurling ===
Caragh

- Kildare Junior Hurling Championship 1984 Éire Óg Corra Choill 2017
- Kildare Junior Hurling League (2) 1983, 1984

Corra Choill

- Kildare Intermediate Hurling Championship (1) 1988

Éire Óg

- Kildare Senior Hurling Championship (10) 1964, 1965, 1966, 1967, 1969, 1970, 1971, 1972, 1977, 1984
- Kildare Intermediate Hurling Championship (2) 1960, 1975

Éire Óg Corra Choill

- Kildare Senior B Hurling Championship: (1) 2022
- Kildare Intermediate Hurling Championship (1) 1996

=== Camogie ===
Caragh

- Kildare Senior Camogie Championship: (3) 1958, 1965, 1966
- Kildare Senior Camogie League (4) 1964, 1965, 1966, 1967

Prosperous

- Kildare Senior Camogie Championship: (7) 1972, 1974, 1975, 1976, 1977, 1980, 1981
- Kildare Senior Camogie League (8) 1974, 1975, 1976, 1977, 1981, 1984, 1985, 1986

== See also ==
- Camogie
- Caragh GAA
- Raheens GAA
