= Jack Sheridan (hurler) =

Irish hurler

Personal information
- Native name: Seán Ó Sirideáin (Irish)
- Born: 1997 (age 28–29) Naas, County Kildare, Ireland

Sport
- Sport: Hurling
- Position: Full-forward
Club
- Years: Club
- 2015-present: Naas
Club titles
- Kildare titles: 5
- Leinster titles: 1 intermediate
- All-Ireland Titles: 1 intermediate
Inter-county
- Years: County
- 2016-present: Kildare
Inter-county titles
- Leinster titles: 0
- All-Irelands: 0
- NHL: 0
- All Stars: 0

Jack Sheridan (born 1997) is an Irish hurler. At club level, he plays with Naas and at inter-county level with the Kildare senior hurling team. He usually lines out as a forward.

== Career ==
Sheridan first played hurling at juvenile and underage levels with the Naas club, while also playing at all levels with Piper's Hill College. He had a very successful underage career, winning three successive Kildare MAHC titles, as well as three successive Kildare U21AHC titles between 2013 and 2018.

After progressing to the club's senior team, Sheridan was part of the Naas team that won five consecutive Kildare SHC titles between 2019 and 2023. He also won a Leinster Club IHC title and was part of the Naas team that beat Kilmoyley in the 2022 All-Ireland Club IHC final.

Sheridan first appeared on the inter-county scene with Kildare as a member of the minor team in 2015. He later spent three consecutive seasons with the under-21 team. Sheridan made his senior team debut in Kildare's successful Kehoe Cup-winning-campaign in 2016. He also won a record four Christy Ring Cup medals between 2018 and 2024.

== Honours ==
Naas

- All-Ireland Intermediate Club Hurling Championship 2022
- Leinster Intermediate Club Hurling Championship 2021
- Kildare Senior Hurling Championship: 2019, 2020, 2021, 2022, 2023
- Kildare Under-21 A Hurling Championship: 2016, 2017, 2018
- Kildare Minor A Hurling Championship: 2013, 2014, 2015

Kildare

- Christy Ring Cup: 2018, 2020, 2022, 2024
- National Hurling League Division 2B: 2021
- Kehoe Cup: 2016, 2024
