= Brian Byrne (dual player) =

Irish Gaelic footballer and hurler

Personal information
- Born: 1995 (age 30–31) Naas, County Kildare, Ireland
- Occupation: Financial consultant

Sport
- Football Position: Centre-back
- Hurling Position: Right wing-forward
Club
- Years: Club
- 2013-present: Naas
Club titles
| | Football | Hurling |
| Kildare titles | 4 | 6 |
College
- Years: College
- University College Dublin
College titles
- Sigerson titles: 1
- Fitzgibbon titles: 0
Inter-county
- Years: County
- 2015–2023 2024–: Kildare (SH); Kildare (SF)
Inter-county titles
| | Football | Hurling |
| Leinster Titles | 0 | 0 |
| All-Ireland Titles | 0 | 0 |
| League titles | 0 | 0 |
| All-Stars | 0 | 0 |

Brian Byrne (born 1995) is an Irish Gaelic footballer and hurler. At club level he plays with Naas and at inter-county level he has lined out as a dual player with Kildare.

== Career ==
Byrne plays his club hurling and Gaelic football with the naas club. After minor and under-21 championship successes in both codes, he progressed to adult level as a dual player. Byrne was part of the Naas senior hurling team that has won six consecutive Kildare SHC titles between 2019 and 2024. He also captained the team to the All-Ireland Club IHC title after a defeat of Kilmoyley in the final. Byrne has also won four consecutive Kildare SFC titles.

On the inter-county scene, Byrne first played for Kildare as a dual player at minor level and won a Leinster MFC in 2013. He progressed to the under-21 teams but ended his tenure without success. Byrne subsequently joined the Kildare senior hurling team and captained the team to three Christy Ring Cup triumphs. He also won National League honours in 2021. Byrne switched codes and joined the Kildare senior football team for the 2024 season.

== Honours ==
Naas

- All-Ireland Intermediate Club Hurling Championship: 2022 (c)
- Leinster Intermediate Club Hurling Championship: 2021 (c)
- Kildare Senior Hurling Championship: 2019, 2020, 2021 (c), 2022, 2023, 2024
- Kildare Senior Football Championship: 2021, 2022, 2023, 2024
- Kildare Under-21 Hurling Championship: 2016
- Kildare Under-21 Football Championship: 2016
- Kildare Minor Hurling Championship: 2013

Kildare

- Christy Ring Cup: 2018 (c), 2020 (c), 2022 (c)
- National Hurling League Division 2B: 2021
- Kehoe Cup: 2016, 2023
- Leinster Minor Football Championship: 2013

Sporting positions
| Preceded by | Kildare senior hurling team captain 2018-2022 | Succeeded by James Burke |
Achievements
| Preceded by Marty Kavanagh | Christy Ring Cup winning captain 2018 | Succeeded by Seán Geraghty |
| Preceded by Seán Geraghty | Christy Ring Cup winning captain 2020 | Succeeded by Ben Conneely |
| Preceded by Shane Walsh | All-Ireland Club IHC final winning captain 2022 | Succeeded by Lorcan Lyons |
| Preceded by Ben Conneely | Christy Ring Cup winning captain 2022 | Succeeded by Charlie Ennis; Jack Regan |
