= Conneff Park =

Stadium in County Kildare, Ireland

- Páirc Mhic Conduibh
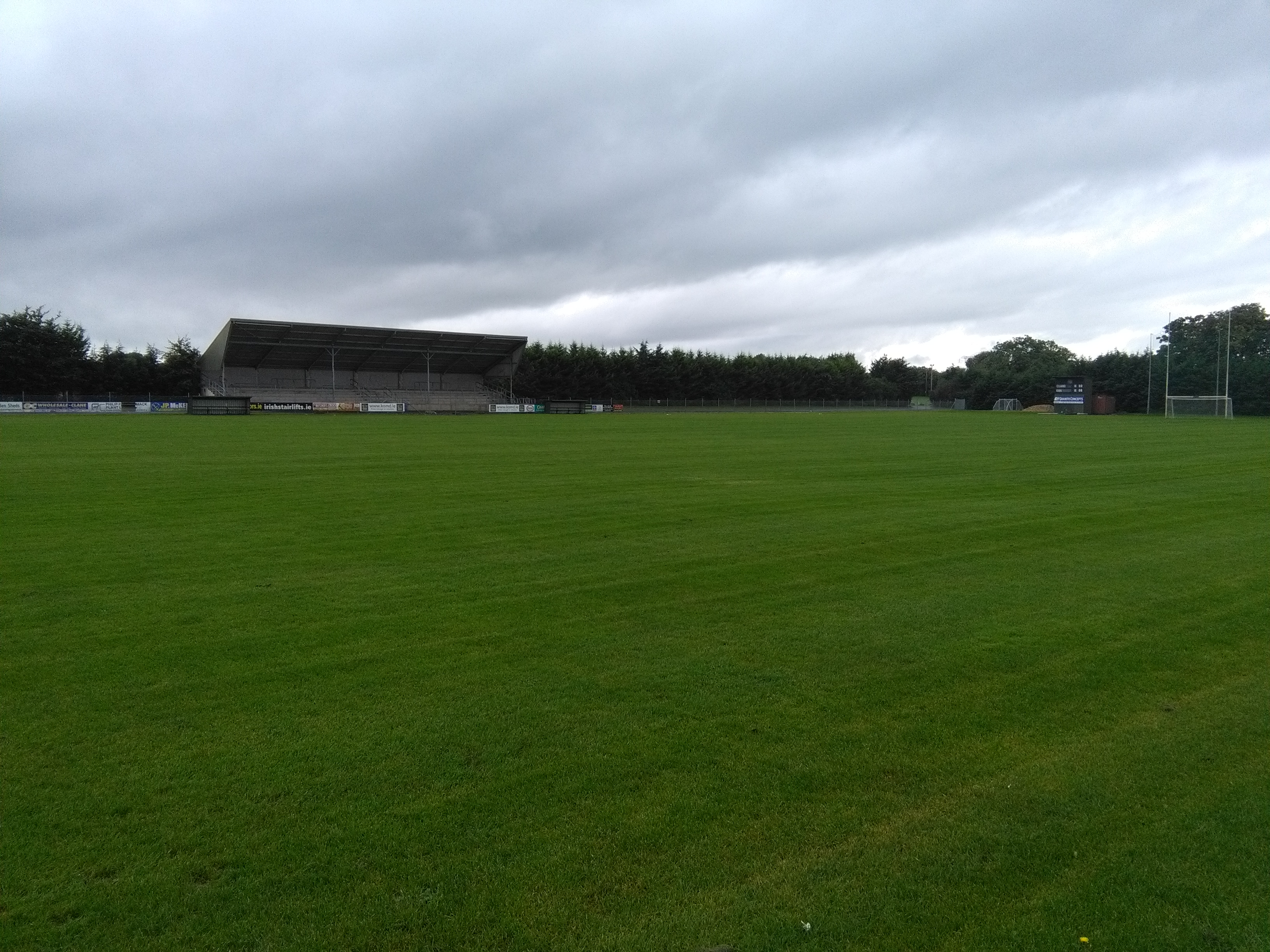

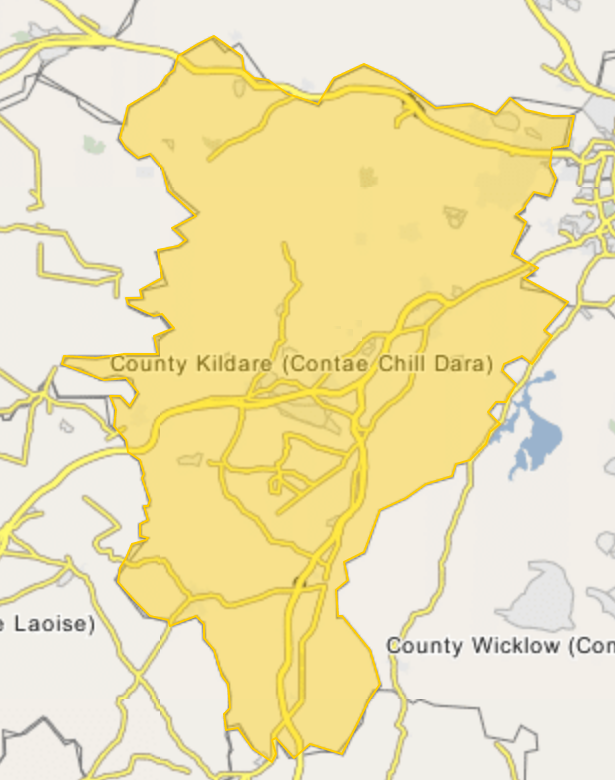
- Location within County Kildare
- Location: Clane, County Kildare, Ireland
- Coordinates: 53°17′22.14″N 6°41′35.66″W
- Public transit: Clane Aldi bus stop (Go-Ahead route 120)
- Owner: Clane GAA
- Capacity: 5,000
- Surface: grass

Construction
- Opened: 1884

Conneff Park is a GAA stadium in Clane, County Kildare, Ireland. It is the home of Clane GAA and one of the main grounds of Kildare's hurling team. The ground is named after Tommy Conneff, an Irish athlete.
