= Ardclough GAA =

Gaelic sports club in County Kildare, Ireland

- Ard Cloch
- Founded: 1936
- County: Kildare
- Nickname: "The Clocks", "The Germans"
- Grounds: Dan Graham Memorial Park, Ardclough
- Coordinates: 53.296324°N 6.565962°W

Playing kits
Standard colours

Senior Club Championships
	All Ireland	Leinster champions	Kildare champions
Football:	-	-	1
Hurling:	-	-	13
Camogie:	-	-	1

Ardclough is a Gaelic Athletic Association (GAA) club in Ardclough, County Kildare, Ireland. The club's biggest achievements include winning the Kildare County Senior Football Championship after a replayed final against the Army in 1949, winning 13 Kildare County Senior Hurling Championships, the latest in 2017 beating Naas in the final, defeating Buffer's Alley in the 1976 Leinster Senior Club Hurling Championship and winning the Leinster Intermediate Club Hurling Championship in 2006.

== History ==
RIC records from 1890 show that Hazlehatch Irish Harpers, based on Lord Concurry's field near Skeagh, had 70 members with officers listed as Ambrose Dwyer, Christy Fitzsimons, Michael Saunders and John Cantwell. John Buggle is listed as an officer with Kilteel King O'Tooles club. Thomas Kenny from Ardclough bore the nickname "The Harper" Kenny all his life. An Ardclough club competed in the 1924–27 championships. The current club was founded at a meeting in Mick Treacy's workshop in 1936, growing out of an under-14 team organised by Fr O'Brien at Ardclough national school, and the hurling club founded by Mick Houlihan in 1949.

== Gaelic Football ==
Ardclough were the smallest community to win the Kildare Senior Football Championship when Dan Graham's team beat a star-studded Army team in the replay of the 1949 county final, drawing a record attendance of 10,035 to the replay in St Conleth's Park. Goalkeeper Jim Nolan was the star of the drawn match, Christy Burke was the star of the replay, when a Dick McKenna goal before half-time and a series of points from the "Butcher" Graham and Jimmy Butler gave Ardclough a 1-11 to 2–6 victory. They lost the 1953 semi-final by a point and beat both the Army and Sarsfields in Leader Cup finals before being regraded in 1958. Their rivalry with Sarsfields exploded into controversy in the 1950 county semi-final before a record 7,730 attendance. Ardclough's 1968 Jack Higgins Cup winners merged with the survivors of Kills' 1962 semi-final team to create area team Wolfe Tones which went to the 1971 semi-final and a three-point defeat to Carbury. Ardclough won the Junior A and Jack Higgins Cup in championship in 2000.

Ardclough forms St Edward's along with Rathcoffey and Straffan for underage purposes and St Edward's fields teams at all levels from Under 9 to Under 21.

== Hurling ==
Ardclough contested 20 county finals in success between 1963 and 1985, including a notorious battle with Éire Óg in 1973. The club beat Buffer's Alley in the 1976 Leinster Senior Club Hurling Championship and was the first from Kildare to win an All Ireland Feile Division 4 in 1993. Ardclough regarded senior for the second time after winning the 1959 Junior championship and a morale-boost by the victory of their minors in 1956, inspired by Tim Gleeson and Kieran O'Malley. The careers of Tommy Christian, Mick Duane, Colm O'Malley and Bobby Burke spanned all twenty years. The 16-year-old Richie Cullen played his first final at centre field in 1966 and afterwards at full-back. Wexford born Ned Walsh came in 1967 and was joined by his brother, free-scoring Johnny Walsh in 1970. Ardclough contested nine successive finals against Éire Óg (1965 to 1974), a record for any grade in football and hurling, including their first title in 1968 when one of their minors, Richie Cullen, captained the team. Der Connor, John Cummins and Mick Duane contributed to the 2–12 total against 3–3 for Éire Óg. Counting semi-finals the sides met for 14 consecutive seasons. Even though it took 19 years to win their next senior title Ardclough played a prominent role in Kildare hurling, losing the 1998 final by a point to Colm Byrne's late free for Coill Dubh. Ardclough returned to beat Coill Dubh 2–12 to 0–11 in the 2004 county final with goals from Andy Whelan and Padraig O'Malley. Ardclough regained the title in 2006 with a four point win over Confey. They then went on to make history winning the Leinster Intermediate Club Hurling Championship beating Ratharney of Westmeath in the final.

== Camogie ==
Ardclough camogie club was founded in 1962 by Mick Houlihan, Patrick O’Connor and Ann Johnson, the original colours were brown and yellow, now black, red and yellow,. Josie O’Connor captained the team that won the championship in 1968.

== Honours ==
- Kildare GAA Club of the Year 2006.

=== Hurling ===
- Kildare Senior Hurling Championship Winners (13): 1968, 1973, 1975, 1976, 1979, 1980, 1981, 1982, 1983, 1985, 2004, 2006, 2017
- Leinster Intermediate Club Hurling Championship Winners (1): 2006
- Kildare Senior Hurling League Champions (15): 1966, 1967, 1968, 1970, 1972, 1973, 1974, 1977, 1978, 1979, 1980, 1981, 1983, 2005, 2013
- Centenary Senior Hurling Championship (1): 1984
- Kildare Junior Hurling Championship Winners (3):1949, 1954, 1959
- Kildare Under-21 Hurling Championship Winners (4): 1964, 1997, 1998, 1999, 2010* (Killard)
- Kildare Minor Hurling Championship Winners (6): 1956, 1968, 1995, 1996, 2006, 2008
- Kildare Minor Hurling B Championship Champions (2): 2004, 2005

=== Football ===
- Kildare Senior Football Championship Winners (1) 1949
- Kildare Senior Football League Champions (2): 1949, 1950
- Kildare Intermediate Football Championship Winners (1) 1943
- Kildare Junior Football Championship: Winners (4) 1941, 1959, 1968, 2000
- Kildare Intermediate Football League Champions (1): 1959
- Kildare Junior Football League Champions (4):1940, 1943, 1944, 1951
- Kildare Senior Football League Division 3 Champions (1): 1976
- The Leinster Leader Junior Club Cup 2003.

=== Camogie ===
- Kildare Senior Camogie Championship 1968
- Kildare Intermediate Camogie Champions 1988
- Kildare Junior Camogie Champions 1983, 2000, 2020
- Kildare Camogie Senior League Runners-up 1967, 1969, 1971
- Kildare Intermediate Camogie League 1988

== Bibliography ==
- Kildare GAA: A Centenary History, by Eoghan Corry, CLG Chill Dara, 1984, ISBN 0-9509370-0-2 hb ISBN 0-9509370-1-0 pb
- Kildare GAA yearbook, 1972, 1974, 1978, 1979, 1980 and 2000– in sequence especially the Millennium yearbook of 2000
- Soaring Sliothars: Centenary of Kildare Camogie 1904–2004 by Joan O'Flynn Kildare County Camogie Board.
