= Leixlip GAA =

Gaelic games club in County Kildare, Ireland

Leixlip
- Léim an Bhradáin
- Founded: 1887
- County: Kildare
- Nickname: Mary's
- Colours: Maroon and White
- Grounds: Radley Park, Green Lane, Leixlip
- Coordinates: 53.365202°N 6.498842°W

Playing kits
Standard colours

Senior Club Championships
	All Ireland	Leinster champions	Kildare champions
Hurling:	0	0	1

Leixlip GAA is a Gaelic Athletic Association (GAA) club in Leixlip, County Kildare, Ireland. They were senior football finalists in 1986, club of the year 1979, and home club of Matt Goff who featured on the Kildare millennium football team at full-back.

== Geography ==
The Leixlip club was first affiliated to the Gaelic Athletic Association in 1887. For the following few years progress was slow and club activity was haphazard. However, in 1912 a meeting was convened in the local school for the purpose of re-forming the club. John J Radley, a local school-master agreed to act as Honorary Secretary and another teacher, P Mullaney – then a member of the Leinster Council of the GAA – was appointed as his assistant. A committee was formed and, due to the influence of a local priest, Fr. Dooley, permission was given by the late William Mooney of Leixlip Castle, for the use of a field for matches and practice.

In 1939 a clubhouse was opened in the Main Street and was the centre of activities until the 1950s when a premises, now Tuthills Shop, was purchased on the Captains Hill and converted to a hall at a cost in excess of IR£600. It was named the "Joe Fox Memorial Hall" as a tribute to Joe’s many years of endeavour in promoting the ideals of Cumann Luthchleas Gael in Leixlip and County Kildare. In 1954, £1,200 was spent on the purchase of out present grounds. The initial development cost £600 and the official opening took place on 3 October 1954. The above amount of money was a large investment in those days as Leixlip was then a very small village community.

On 6 June 1975, the President of Ireland, Mr. Cearbhall Ó Dálaigh, laid the foundation stone for the complex and on the 1 October 1978, the official opening was performed by then President of the GAA, Mr. Con Murphy. The Centenary Year of the GAA 1984 was marked by a special Club Day - ‘Lá na gClub'. The Club’s Centenary was celebrated in 1987 and proved to be a gala occasion, the centrepiece being a special Banquet at which the guest of honour was the Association's former President, Dr. Michael Loftus. The young members of the club put on a striking pageant – depicting the history of the club. It was an impressive performance and is now recorded for posterity on Video.

Radley Park was re-opened on 12 May 1991 by the then President of the GAA, Mr. Peter Quinn. 16 May 2004 saw the culmination of years of endeavour by the members and the financial and moral support of the local community when the Minister of Finance and TD, Mr. Charlie McCreevy officiated at the opening the club’s new facilities.

== Football ==
Six years after their foundation St Mary's lost a replayed junior final to Paul Doyle's Maddenstown team. Leixlip's team led by Tom Farrell and Ned Malone were defeated in the 1924 Kildare junior final by Roseberry, won the Intermediate championship in 1929 and played two Leader Cup finals in 1937, beating Carbury in a replay in Kilcock, and 1940, losing to Carbury in Rathcoffey. Matt Goff played on the Ireland Tailteann Games team of 1928 and won two All Ireland medals with Kildare.

Andy Walsh was an inter-county goalkeeper in the 1930s.

Donegal inter-county goalkeeper Seamus Hoare played for the club and was also a selector.

Kerry All Star Jack O'Shea played with Leixlip in the late 1980s and 1990s.

Ronan Quinn and Enda Murphy represented Kildare, while Enda played for Ireland in International Rules Series.

Tommy Moolick captained Kildare U21s to their 10th Leinster crown in April 2013.

The club's last success at senior level was in 2021, when they won the Senior B Reserve Championship. They beat Raheens GAA in the final.

Leixlip were relegated to intermediate status in 2018. A year later in 2019 the senior football team reached the intermediate football county final where they play Monasterevin on 13 October.

== Hurling ==
Hurling was played sporadically in the early 1900s and revived in 1931. One of the clubs' greatest hurling achievements occurred in 1986 when it won the Kildare Senior Hurling Championship. Christy Timmins was the sides then manager.

== Ladies' football ==
Leixlip are one of three original Ladies' Football clubs in County Kildare. They initially played in the Dublin leagues, affiliating to Kildare on the foundation of the county board in 1992. They were Kildare junior champions in 2004 and intermediate champions in 2005. They went on to win the Kildare Senior title in 2006, 2007, 2008, 2011 and 2015

== Honours ==
- Kildare Senior Hurling Championship: 1986
- Kildare Senior B Hurling Championship: 2023
- Kildare Senior Football League Division 1: 1937, 1998, 1999
- Kildare Senior Football Reserve A Championship: 1999, 2003
- Kildare Senior Football Reserve B Championship: 2021
- Kildare Senior Football Reserve C Championship: 2025
- Kildare Senior Football Reserve D Championship: 2012
- Kildare Senior Football Reserve E Championship: 2009
- Kildare Senior Football Reserve A League: 2014
- Kildare Senior Football Reserve D League: 2021
- Kildare Under-21 A Football Championship: 1996
- Kildare Under-21 A Shield Football Championship: 2012
- Kildare Minor Football Championship: 1987, 1988,1990, 1992, 1994, 1999, 2000, 2001
- Kildare Intermediate Football Championship: 1929, 1934
- Kildare Junior Football Championship: 1952, 1980
- Kildare Junior Hurling Championship: 1962, 1971, 1977, 2025

== See also ==
- Brendan Hackett, who managed the club between 1983 and 1985

== Bibliography ==
- St Mary's GAA Club Leixlip 1887-1978 by Pat Burke (Leixlip 1978) 104pp
- St Mary's GAA Club, Leixlip - A History by Pat Burke And Colette McCormack (Leixlip GAA 1984), 232pp
- Matt Goff Commemorative Booklet by Eoghan Corry (2005)
- Kildare GAA: A Centenary History, by Eoghan Corry, CLG Chill Dara, 1984, ISBN 0-9509370-0-2 hb ISBN 0-9509370-1-0 pb
- Kildare GAA yearbook, 1972, 1974, 1978, 1979, 1980 and 2000- in sequence especially the Millennium yearbook of 2000
- Soaring Sliothars: Centenary of Kildare Camogie 1904-2004 by Joan O'Flynn Kildare County Camogie Board.
