= Kildare Senior Hurling Championship =

Annual hurling competition

- Current season or competition: 2026 Kildare Senior Hurling Championship
- Irish: Craobh Iomáint Shinsir Chill Dara
- Code: Hurling
- Founded: 1888; 138 years ago
- Region: Kildare (GAA)
- Trophy: Tony Carew Memorial Perpetual Cup
- No. of teams: 8
- Title holders: Naas (14th title)
- Most titles: Clane (16 titles)
- Sponsors: UPMC
- Official website: Kildare GAA

The Kildare Senior Hurling Championship (known for sponsorship reasons as the UPMC Kildare Senior Hurling Championship and abbreviated to the Kildare SHC) is an annual club hurling competition organised by the Kildare County Board of the Gaelic Athletic Association and contested by the top-ranking senior clubs in the county of Kildare in Ireland, deciding the competition winners through a group and knockout format. It is the most prestigious competition in Kildare hurling.

The winner of the Kildare Senior Championship qualifies for the subsequent Leinster Club Championship. From 1971 until 2012, the winning team received the Seán Carey Cup, however, a new trophy in honour of the late Tony Carew (Coill Dubh) was donated by the Carew family in 2013.

The competition has been won by 25 teams, 19 of which have won it more than once. Clane is the most successful team in the tournament's history, having won it 16 times. Naas are the reigning champions, having beaten Maynooth GAA by 3-13 to 0-11 in the 2026 final.

== Format ==
=== Group stage ===
The 8 club teams are divided into two groups of four. Over the course of the group stage, each team plays once against the others in the group, resulting in each team being guaranteed at least three group games. Two points are awarded for a win, one for a draw and zero for a loss. The teams are ranked in the group stage table by points gained, then scoring difference and then their head-to-head record. The top two teams in both groups qualify for the knockout stage.

=== Knockout stage ===
Semi-finals: The two semi-finals feature the top 2 teams. Two teams qualify for the next round.

Final: The two semi-final winners contest the final. The winning team are declared champions.

=== Relegation ===
The bottom 2 teams of each group face in a semi-final. The 2 losers face in a relegation play-off with the loser being relegated to the Intermediate Championship

== Teams ==
=== 2026 teams ===
The 8 teams competing in the 2026 Kildare Senior Hurling Championship were:

Team	Location	Colours	Position in 2026	In championship since	Championship titles	Last championship title
Ardclough	Ardclough	—	Relegation Semi-Final	?	13	2017
Celbridge	Celbridge	Blue and white	Semi-finals	?	8	2018
Coill Dubh	Coill Dubh	Red and white	Relegation Semi-Final	?	11	2015
Confey	Leixlip	White and green	Relegated to IHC	?	3	2012
Clane	Clane	White	Relegation Final	2026	16	1922
Éire Óg-Corrachoill	Caragh	Maroon and yellow	Semi-finals	?	10	1984
Maynooth	Maynooth	Black and white	Runners-up	?	6	1939
Naas	Naas	Blue and white	Champions	?	14	2026

=== 2026 Hurling Grades ===
In 2026 the Hurling grades were majorly reformed. The former Senior B Championship was discontinued and its team transferred to the Intermediate Championship. 2nd teams are removed from the Junior Championship and play a separate Reserve league.

Championship	Team
Senior
Senior	Ardclough
Senior	Celbridge
Senior	Clane
Senior	Coill Dubh
Senior	Confey
Senior	Éire Óg-Corrachoill
Senior	Maynooth
Senior	Naas
Intermediate
Intermediate	Broadford
Intermediate	Leixlip
Intermediate	Maynooth (2nd team)
Intermediate	Moorefield
Intermediate	Naas (2nd team)
Intermediate	St Laurence's
Junior
Junior	Athy
Junior	Cappagh
Junior	Kilcock
Junior	Rathagan
Junior	Ros glas
Junior	Round Towers
Junior	Sarsfields
Junior	Wolfe Tones

== Qualification for subsequent competitions ==
At the end of the championship, the winning team qualify to the subsequent Leinster Senior Club Hurling Championship.

== Roll of honour ==
=== By club ===
#	Club	Titles	Runners-up	Championships won	Championships runner-up
1	Clane	16	1	1903, 1904, 1905, 1906, 1907, 1908, 1909, 1910, 1911, 1914, 1915, 1916, 1917, 1918, 1919, 1922	1913
2	Naas	14	9	1951, 1952, 1994, 1997, 2001, 2002, 2019, 2020, 2021, 2022, 2023, 2024, 2025, 2026	1908, 1946, 1947, 1948, 1995, 1996, 2000, 2016, 2017
3	Ardclough	13	17	1968, 1973, 1975, 1976, 1979, 1980, 1981, 1982, 1983, 1985, 2004, 2006, 2017	1962, 1965, 1966, 1967, 1969, 1970, 1971, 1972, 1974, 1977, 1978, 1986, 1998, 2003, 2008, 2015, 2018
4	Coill Dubh	11	13	1987, 1990, 1993, 1995, 1996, 1998, 1999, 2000, 2003, 2014, 2015	1988, 1991, 1994, 1997, 2001, 2002, 2004, 2005, 2007, 2009, 2010, 2019, 2023
5	Éire Óg-Corrachoill	10	9	1964, 1965, 1966, 1967, 1969, 1970, 1971, 1972, 1977, 1984	1968, 1973, 1982, 1987, 1990, 1992, 1993, 1999, 2013
6	Celbridge	8	6	1921, 2005, 2009, 2010, 2011, 2013, 2016, 2018	1906, 1919, 1924, 2012, 2014, 2021
7	Curragh Camp	7	1	1938, 1940, 1941, 1942, 1944, 1948, 1955	1949
8	Gough / McDonagh Barracks	6	1	1925, 1929, 1931, 1932, 1934, 1935	1959
8	Maynooth	6	9	1891, 1896, 1913, 1924, 1937, 1939	1888, 1903, 1904, 1905, 1938, 1943, 2022, 2024, 2025, 2026
10	Killinthomas	4	0	1946, 1947, 1949, 1950	—
11	Athy	3	6	1928, 1936, 1959	1909, 1929, 1937, 1945, 1961, 1964
11	Confey	3	3	2007, 2008, 2012	2006, 2011, 2020
11	Moorefield	3	2	1943, 1963, 1991	1890, 1896
11	Castledermot	3	2	1988, 1989, 1992	1983, 1985
11	Military College	3	1	1957, 1958, 1962	1960
11	Monasterevin	3	0	1888, 1889, 1890	—
17	Broadford	2	10	1960, 1961	1925, 1936, 1939, 1942, 1944, 1957, 1958, 1963, 1984, 1989
17	St Conleth's	2	5	1901, 1902	1910, 1914, 1915, 1917, 1921
17	St Barbara's	2	0	1954, 1955	—
20	St Brigid's	1	3	1978	1976, 1980, 1981
20	Leixlip	1	2	1986	1931, 1979
20	Suncroft	1	1	1974	1975
20	Newbridge College	1	0	1900	—
20	Eoghan Ruadh	1	0	1945	—
20	Rathangan/Killina	1	0	1953	—
26	Clongorey	0	1	—	1891
26	Eyrefield	0	1	—	1916
26	Johnstownbridge	0	1	—	1928
26	Rathcoffey	0	1	—	1934
26	Artillery	0	1	—	1950

=== Notes ===
- Runners-up unknown: 1889–1902, 1907, 1911, 1918, 1922, 1932, 1935, 1940–41, 1951–56.

== List of finals ==
=== Legend ===
- Gold – Leinster intermediate club champions
- Silver – Leinster intermediate club runners-up

=== List of Kildare SHC finals ===
Year	Winners		Runners-up	
Year	Club	Score	Club	Score
2026	Naas	3-13	Maynooth	0-11
2025	Naas	3-15	Maynooth	0-16
2024	Naas	3-20	Maynooth	0-12
2023	Naas	3-13	Coill Dubh	0-11
2022	Naas	0-20	Maynooth	0-12
2021	Naas	1-16	Celbridge	1-13
2020	Naas	2-20	Confey	1-09
2019	Naas	0-15	Coill Dubh	0-12
2018	Celbridge	2-16	Ardclough	1-15
2017	Ardclough	1-15	Naas	1-12
2016	Celbridge	0-17	Naas	1-08
2015	Coill Dubh	0-15	Ardclough	1-10
2014	Coill Dubh	3-11	Celbridge	0-16
2013	Celbridge	0-23	Éire Óg-Corrachoill	2-11
2012	Confey	1-16	Celbridge	0-14
2011	Celbridge	2-16	Confey	0-15
2010	Celbridge	0-12	Coill Dubh	1-08
2009	Celbridge	0-18	Coill Dubh	0-16
2008	Confey	3-13	Ardclough	1-15
2007	Confey	3-08	Coill Dubh	0-10
2006	Ardclough	3-09	Confey	0-14
2005	Celbridge	1-14	Coill Dubh	0-09
2004	Ardclough	2-12	Coill Dubh	0-11
2003	Coill Dubh	0-16	Ardclough	1-09
2002	Naas	(0-08) 4-12	Coill Dubh	(0-08) 3-13
2001	Naas	0-13	Coill Dubh	1-05
2000	Coill Dubh	1-11	Naas	1-07
1999	Coill Dubh	1-14	Éire Óg-Corrachoill	1-06
1998	Coill Dubh	1-17	Ardclough	2-13
1997	Naas	3-10	Coill Dubh	1-08
1996	Coill Dubh	2-09	Naas	1-09
1995	Coill Dubh	(2-10) 1-07	Naas	(1-13) 1-06
1994	Naas	(2-06) 2-14	Coill Dubh	(2-06) 1-12
1993	Coill Dubh	0 -13	Éire Óg	1-08
1992	Castledermot	4-11	Éire Óg	0-12
1991	Moorefield	(2-06) 2-11	Coill Dubh	(2-06) 2-08
1990	Coill Dubh	3-10	Éire Óg	2-07
1989	Castledermot	5-06	Broadford	1-15
1988	Castledermot	3-06	Coill Dubh	1-06
1987	Coill Dubh	0-16	Éire Óg	1-08
1986	St Mary's, Leixlip	3-07	Ardclough	1-08
1985	Ardclough	1-09	Castledermot	1-07
1984	Éire Óg	1-09	Broadford	0-06
1983	Ardclough	1-10	Castledermot	0-06
1982	Ardclough	1-09	Éire Óg	1-06
1981	Ardclough	1-11	St Brigid's	0-07
1980	Ardclough	4-09	St Brigid's	0-03
1979	Ardclough	1-10	St Mary's, Leixlip	3-01
1978	St Brigid's	3-10	Ardclough	2-09
1977	Éire Óg	3-09	Ardclough	1-12
1976	Ardclough	2-11	St Brigid's	2-09
1975	Ardclough	7-18	Suncroft	0-07
1974	Suncroft	4-05	Ardclough	0-11
1973	Ardclough	3-09	Éire Óg	1-06
1972	Éire Óg	1-10	Ardclough	0-09
1971	Éire Óg	2-09	Ardclough	1-09
1970	Éire Óg	3-11	Ardclough	1-04
1969	Éire Óg	5-11	Ardclough	1-05
1968	Ardclough	2-12	Éire Óg	3-03
1967	Éire Óg	3-10	Ardclough	2-07
1966	Éire Óg	1-07	Ardclough	0-03
1965	Éire Óg	4-04	Ardclough	2-04
1964	Éire Óg	5-09	Athy	2-06
1963	Moorefield		Broadford	
1962	Military College		Ardclough	
1961	Broadford		Athy	
1960	Broadford		Military College	
1959	Athy		McDonagh	(walk-over)
1958	Military College		Broadford	
1957	Military College		Broadford	
1956	Curragh			
1955	St Barbara's			
1954	St Barbara's			
1953	Rathangan/Killin			
1952	Naas			
1951	Naas			
1950	Killinthomas		Artillery	
1949	Killinthomas		Curragh	
1948	Curragh		Naas	
1947	Killinthomas		Naas	
1946	Killinthomas		Naas	
1945	Eoghan Ruadh		Athy	
1944	Curragh		Broadford	
1943	Moorefield		Maynooth	
1942	Curragh		Broadford	
1941	Curragh			
1940	Curragh			
1939	Maynooth		Broadford	
1938	Curragh		Maynooth	
1937	Maynooth		Athy	
1936	Athy		Broadford	
1935	McDonaghs			
1934	McDonaghs		Rathcoffey	
1933	Championship unfinished			
1932	McDonagh			
1931	McDonagh		Leixlip	
1930	No Competition			
1929	McDonaghs		Athy	
1928	Athy		Johnstownbridge	
1927	No Competition			
1926	No Competition			
1925	Gough Barracks		Broadford	
1924	Maynooth		Celbridge	
1923	Championship unfinished			
1922	Clane			
1921	Celbridge		St Conleth's	
1920	Championship unfinished			
1919	Clane		Celbridge	
1918	Clane			
1917	Clane		St Conleth's	
1916	Clane		Eyrefield	
1915	Clane		St Conleth's	
1914	Clane		St Conleth's	
1913	Maynooth		Clane	
1912	Championship unfinished			
1911	Clane			
1910	Clane		St Conleth's	
1909	Clane		Athy	
1908	Clane		Naas	
1907	Clane			
1906	Clane		Celbridge	
1905	Clane		Maynooth	
1904	Clane		Maynooth	
1903	Clane		Maynooth	
1902	St Conleth's			
1901	St Conleth's			
1900	St Thomas			
1899	No Competition			
1898	No Competition			
1897	No Competition			
1896	Maynooth		Moorefield	
1895	No Competition			
1894	No Competition			
1893	No Competition			
1892	No Competition			
1891	Maynooth		Clongorey	
1890	Monasterevin		Moorefield	
1889	Monasterevin			
1888	Monasterevin		Maynooth	

== See also ==
- Kildare Senior B Hurling Championship (former Tier 2, retired in 2026)
- Kildare Intermediate Hurling Championship (Tier 2)
