= Clane GAA =

Gaelic Athletic Association club in Ireland

- Claonadh
- Founded: 1884
- County: Kildare
- Nickname: The Lilywhites
- Colours: All White
- Grounds: Conneff Park, Clane
- Coordinates: 53.2897°N 6.6925°W

Playing kits
Standard colours

Senior Club Championships
	All Ireland	Leinster champions	Kildare champions
Football:	0	0	17
Hurling:	0	0	16
Camogie:	0	0	1

Clane GAA is a Gaelic Athletic Association (GAA) club in Clane, County Kildare, Ireland, winner of 17 Kildare county senior football championships, 16 county senior hurling championships and Kildare club of the year in 1975. Clane players are credited with bringing the handpass into Gaelic football.

== History ==
Clane town sports pre-date the GAA, those of 12 June 1884 on a field opposite the Dispensary House being reported as "ayquel to Punchestown" by the Leinster Leader. A Leinster Leader report in April 1887 stated that Clane had "the honour of being the first club to be established in County Kildare". Clane were the first Kildare football champions. A Clongowes teacher member of the team, Professor Crowley, was later accredited with having invented the handpass. RIC records from 1890 show that Clane's William O'Briens had 50 members with officers listed as CJ O'Connor (who was also first chairman of Kildare county board) John Geoghegan, Maurice Sammon and James Archer. A set of white jerseys from a house rugby team at Clongowes, used by the club after 1901, were used for the 1903 All Ireland final leading to the tradition of Kildare wearing all white as their county colours: the Lily Whites.

== Gaelic Football ==
The Clane-Roseberry duopoly between 1901 and 1910 was responsible for raising standards in Kildare. A number of Clane players participated in Kildare's twice-replayed home final appearance against Kerry in 1903 and first All Ireland success in 1905. By the time the club was affected by the Irish Civil War, it had won eight county titles.

The club experienced a "revival" in the 1960s and won three more titles. These included a dramatic comeback of 1967 which turned a four-point deficit into a six-point win in the final ten minutes. In the 1990s, Clane won four more titles in a six-year period. After Clane won the 1997 Kildare Senior Football Championship with nine Kildare players in the line-up, they went to the Leinster Senior Club Football Championship final, eventually losing to Erin's Isle, and provided six players for the Kildare team that reached the 1998 All-Ireland Senior Football Championship final.

While wearing Clane colours, a joint team of members of the Clane and Rathcoffey parish were victorious in the LGFA u12 Community Games All-Ireland final in 2025, being heralded by the club chairman as Clane's first All-Ireland trophy in an address to the team following their return to the club following the victory.

== Hurling ==
The club established a hurling section in 1903. Clane went on to win 16 hurling titles before 1922, including a significant comeback against Landenstown from seven points down in 1920. A split in 1922, possibly related to the civil war, led to the establishment of Mainham hurling club. In their most successful period, Clane had lost just two finals, to Maynooth on objection in 1913 and to Celbridge when some of their players were missing in 1921. They returned to senior ranks in the 1990s. The club were league champions in 2009.

Clane won the Senior B Hurling Championship on September 28, 2025 beating Leixlip by a single point in 'a cracker' of a final. Clane then progressed to the Leinster Junior Hurling Championship Final (the first Kildare team to reach the final), beating Naomh Moninne of Louth and Clonad of Laois en route before losing to Davidstown-Courtnacuddy in the decider. In 2026, Clane were promoted back to Division 1 after they captured the Senior Hurling League Division 2 title defeating Wolfe Tones in the final by 4-25 to 1-11. Clane's 2nd team also won the Senior Hurling League Division 3 title in 2026 defeating Leixlip in the final by 3-16 to 2-11.

Clane have won 4 Minor A hurling Championships including 3 in a row in the late 90's (1997-99) having won 2 Minor B championships in a row just prior to that (1994-95). Clane bridged a 27 year gap when winning the 2026 Minor A Hurling Championship, coming from 7 points down early the 2nd half to beat Naas in a titanic battle by 2-13 to 2-12.

Clane also won the Kildare Junior Hurling Championship in 2013, beating Naas in the final.

== Camogie ==
The camogie club was founded in 1931 when Bridie Ennis was listed as "one of the best players in the county". Clane won the county championship in 1939 shortly before the club lapsed and the best players joined Sallins. A Clane team won the 1953 league and championship, the 1962 senior league, but the club lapsed again 1966-1976. A team was revived in 1976 and won league and championship in 1977 wearing the green gym-slips of the local Scoil Mhuire. They won junior league and championship in 1980 but lapsed in 1983 when the best players joined Prosperous. Geraldine Dwyer and Marianne Johnson were selected on the Kildare camogie team of the century. Clane hosted the final of the 1993 Gael Linn Cup inter-provincial series.

Clane camogie won the Kildare Intermediate final on Sunday 30 September defeating Leixlip on a scoreline of 2–06 to 1-05.

The club's camogie section retained the Intermediate Championship in 2013 with a victory over Leixlip on a scoreline of 4–11 to 3-09.

In 2016, the minor camogie team won the Division 1 Minor Cup final with a score of 1–7 to 0–6 against Naas.

== Honours ==
- Leinster Senior Club Football Championship Finalists 1997
- Kildare Senior Football Championship: (17) 1888, 1892, 1895, 1897, 1901, 1902, 1903, 1916, 1963, 1967, 1975, 1980, 1984, 1991, 1992, 1995, 1997
- Kildare Under-21 'A' Football Championship: (1) 2018
- Kildare Minor A Football Championship(1) 2017
- Kildare Under-21 'A' Football Shield (1) 2013
- Kildare Intermediate Football Championship: (2) 1940, 1949
- Kildare Junior Football Championship: (1) 1929
- Kildare Junior B Football Championship: (1) 1977
- Kildare Minor A Football League: (3) 2015, 2017, 2024
- Kildare Senior Hurling Championship: (16) 1903, 1904, 1905, 1906, 1907, 1908, 1909, 1910, 1911, 1914, 1915, 1916, 1917, 1918, 1919, 1922
- Leinster Junior Club Hurling Championship Finalists 2025
- Kildare Senior B Hurling Championship: Winners (1) 2025
- Kildare Senior Hurling League Winners (1) 2009
- Kildare Senior Hurling League Division 2 Winners (1) 2026
- Kildare Senior Hurling League Division 3 Winners (1) 2026
- Kildare Junior Hurling League Winners (2) 1982, 2008
- Kildare Junior Hurling Championship: (5) 1915, 1945, 1983, 1994, 2013
- Kildare Under-23 'A' Hurling Championship: (1) 2021
- Kildare Under-23 'B' Hurling Championship: (1) 2024
- Kildare Under-21 'B' Hurling Championship: (2) 2018, 2019
- Kildare Minor 'A' Hurling Championship: (4) 1997, 1998, 1999, 2026
- Kildare Minor 'B' Hurling Championship: (3) 1994, 1995, 2019 (amalgamation with Kilcock)
- Kildare Senior Camogie Championship: (1) 1953
- Kildare Intermediate Camogie Championship (3) 2008, 2012, 2013
- Kildare Junior Camogie Championship (2) 1977, 1980
- Kildare Senior Camogie League: (2) 1953, 1962
- Kildare Junior Camogie league: (2) 1976, 1980
- Kildare Minor Camogie Division 1 Winners 2016
- Kildare Junior C Ladies Football Championship: (1) 2008
- Leinster Junior A Ladies Football Championship Finalists: 2014

== Bibliography ==
- Clane GAA A Century - A History Of The Club And The People (Clane GAA Club) 1985, 528pp.
- Kildare GAA: A Centenary History, by Eoghan Corry, CLG Chill Dara, 1984, ISBN 0-9509370-0-2 hb ISBN 0-9509370-1-0 pb
- Kildare GAA yearbook, 1972, 1974, 1978, 1979, 1980 and 2000- in sequence especially the Millennium yearbook of 2000
- Soaring Sliothars: Centenary of Kildare Camogie 1904–2004 by Joan O'Flynn Kildare County Camogie Board.
