= Coill Dubh HC =

Gaelic Athletic Association club

Coill Dubh
- Founded: 1957
- County: Kildare
- Colours: Red and White
- Grounds: Prendergast Park, Coill Dubh
- Coordinates: 53.296465°N 6.821265°W

Playing kits
Standard colours

Senior Club Championships
	All Ireland	Leinster champions	Kildare champions
Hurling:	0	0	11

Coill Dubh Hurling Club is a Gaelic Athletic Association (GAA) club in County Kildare, Ireland, winner of eleven senior hurling championships. Three Coill Dubh players, Seamus Malone, Tony Carew and Tommy Carew were chosen on the Kildare hurling team of the millennium. The club played in every county final between 1990 and 2005 with the exception of 1992. Colm Byrne was selected on the Leinster hurling squad in 1997.

== History ==
Timahoe participated in the reorganization of 1894. Coill Dubh was the largest Bord na Móna village built in Ireland and the only one on a green field site, and shortly after construction the GAA club was established in 1957 by Tom Murtagh from Longford and Vinny O’Rourke from Leitrim. The club almost went out of existence in the early 1980s but came to dominate hurling in Kildare in the 1990s. From 1990 to 2005 the club contest the senior hurling final on every occasion bar 1992.

In 1993 they won an All Ireland under-16 competition, beating Offaly's Kilcormac-Killoughey in the final.

== Gaelic Football ==
The Gaelic football wing of the club lasted very few years. Local players now play with St. Kevin's, Allenwood, Caragh and Ballyteague.

== Hurling ==
The first championship was won by the under-15s in 1961, led by Tony and Tommy Carew and Willie Percival. Maurice Dee, Richie Hayden, Larry Kelly and Tony Carew, who featured on the team that won the Junior Hurling championship in 1968, were on the team that won its first senior hurling championship 19 years later.

== Camogie ==
In 2013, Coill Dubh re-launched their Camogie Club. This was re-launched by Mairead and Eamon Dwyer.

== Honours ==
- Kildare Senior Hurling Championship: (11) 1987, 1990, 1993, 1995, 1996, 1998, 1999, 2000, 2003, 2014, 2015
- Kildare Senior Hurling Championship: Finalists 1988, 1991, 1994, 1997, 2001, 2002, 2004, 2005, 2007
- Kildare Junior Hurling Championship (1) 1968
- Kildare Junior A Hurling Championship (2) 2015, 2016

== Bibliography ==
- Kildare GAA: A Centenary History, by Eoghan Corry, CLG Chill Dara, 1984, ISBN 978-0-9509370-0-7 hb ISBN 978-0-9509370-1-4 pb
- Kildare GAA yearbook, 1972, 1974, 1978, 1979, 1980 and 2000- in sequence especially the Millennium yearbook of 2000
- Soaring Sliothars: Centenary of Kildare Camogie 1904-2004 by Joan O'Flynn Kildare County Camogie Board.
