= Eoghan Corry =

Irish journalist and author

- Born: 19 January 1961 (age 65); Dublin, Ireland
- Education: Rathmines School of Journalism Dublin Institute of Technology; University College Dublin
- Occupation: Travel writer
- Spouse: Orla Corry
- Writing career
- Period: 1978 – present
- Genres: Non-fiction, sports history, history, biography
- Notable work: Illustrated History of the GAA

Eoghan Corry (Irish: Eoghan Ó Cómhraí; born 19 January 1961) is an Irish journalist and author. He has edited travel sections in national newspapers and travel publications since the 1980s. A former sportswriter and sports editor he has written books on sports history, and was founding story-editor of the Gaelic Athletic Association Museum at Croke Park, Dublin, Ireland.

== Awards ==
For service to tourism Cory has been designated a Kentucky Colonel and a freeman of the city of Baltimore. Corry was awarded a lifetime "contribution to the industry" award at the Irish Travel Industry Awards in Dublin on 22 January 2016. He received the Business Travel Journalist of the year award in London in October 2015. Previous awards include Irish sportswriter of the year, young journalist of the year, Seamus Kelly award, MacNamee award for coverage of Gaelic Games and short-listing for sports book of the year.

== Early life ==
Corry was born in Dublin, the third of four children of Patrick Corry (1916–1971) from Kilmacduane, Cooraclare and Anne Corry née MacMahon (1929–2009) from Clahanmore, Milltown Malbay, both from County Clare. He grew up in Ardclough, Straffan, County Kildare, Ireland.

=== Career ===
Corry was educated at Scoil Mhuire, Clane, at the Dublin Institute of Technology (DIT) and University College Dublin (UCD). His first published work, as a teenager, was poetry in English and the Irish language in literary magazines and the New Irish Writing section of The Irish Press.

He began his journalistic career as a sportswriter with The Irish Times and Sunday Tribune where he won several awards and became sports editor. Determined to pursue a career outside of sports journalism, he joined The Sunday Press as a feature writer in 1985 and became features editor of The Irish Press in 1986, bringing younger writers and a more contemporary, polemical and literary style to the paper. He revived the literary and travel sections of the paper and was an adjudicator of the Dublin Theatre Festival awards.

When The Irish Press closed in 1995 he became Features Editor of the short-lived Evening News, storylined the GAA museum in Croke Park in 1998 and was founding editor of High Ball magazine. Since then he has been a columnist, first with The Sunday Business Post and then with the Evening Herald and Irish Independent. As a journalism lecturer in the Dublin Institute of Technology he told students that "journalism is about p-sing people off".

=== Television ===
Eoghan Corry has fronted travel shows broadcast in Ireland and the Middle East and is a regular commentator on travel affairs to Raidió Teilifís Éireann (RTÉ) and TG4, and an occasional guest contributor to BBC Northern Ireland. He wrote the ten-part series GAA@125, screened on Irish television station TG4 in 2009.

== Ciarán Corry ==
His brother Ciarán Corry (21 July 1956 – 26 April 2011) was the author of the "Last Corncrake" column in the Donegal News.

== Select bibliography ==
- "Kildare GAA: A Centenary History", CLG Chill Dara, 1984, ISBN 0-9509370-0-2
- "Barry McGuigan: The Unauthorised Biography, Magill 1985, ISBN 0-9507659-4-5
- "Malachar Misnigh: Rogha Dánta – ó Iriseoir Fánach (Selected Poems in the Irish Language) Cló Morainn 1985
- "Kelloggs Book of Gaelic Games", CLG, 1986.
- "Kingdom Come", Poolbeg 1989. ISBN 1-85371-028-8
- "Catch and Kick", Poolbeg 1989, ISBN 1-85371-063-6
- "Viva: World Cup 1990", Poolbeg 1990, ISBN 1-85371-085-7
- "Gaelsport GAA series," eleven volumes annually 1981–1991.
- "Dr JKL and Mr Doyle: How James Warren Doyle invented Irish Catholicism, Old Ross Press 1992
- "Oakboys: Derry’s Football Dream Come True", Torc, 1993, ISBN 1-898142-10-6
- "Going to America World Cup Poolbeg 1994", ISBN 1-898142-08-4
- "Goal", Merlin Publishing 2002 (co-author), ISBN 1-903582-26-1
- "God and the Referee: Unforgettable GAA Quotations", Hodder Headline, 2005, ISBN 0-340-83976-7
- "GAA book of Lists", Hodder Headline, 2005, ISBN 0-340-89695-7
- "Illustrated History of the Gaelic Athletic Association", Gill & MacMillan, 2005, ISBN 0-7171-3951-4
- "The Nation Holds its Breath", Hodder Headline, 2006. ISBN 0-340-92152-8
- "I'm Glad You Asked Me That: Irish Political Quotations", Hodder Headline, 2007. ISBN 978-0-340-92452-5
- "The History of Gaelic Football", Gill & MacMillan, 2009 ISBN 978-0-7171-4663-5
- "The Irish at Cheltenham", Gill & MacMillan, 2009 ISBN 978-0-7171-4666-6
- The Savvy Traveller: How the Travel Business Works and How to Make it Work For You. Londubh, 2010 ISBN 978-1-907535-00-0
- "The Top Ten of Ireland: 250 Quintessentially Irish Lists, Hamlyn, 2010 ISBN 978-0-600-62066-2
- "Deadlock: The Match Made in Hell" Gill & MacMillan 2011 ISBN 978-0-7171-4814-1
- "The GAA & Revolution in Ireland 1913–1923 Collins Press 2015 (co-author) ISBN 9781848892545
- "ThePress Gang New Island Press 2015 (co-author) ISBN 9781848404786
