= Maynooth GAA =

Gaelic games club in County Kildare, Ireland

Maynooth
- Máigh Núad
- Founded: 1887
- County: Kildare
- Colours: Black and White
- Grounds: Páirc Mhuire, Moyglare Road, Maynooth
- Coordinates: 53.387987°N 6.598878°W

Playing kits
Standard colours

Senior Club Championships
	All Ireland	Leinster champions	Kildare champions
Football:	0	0	2
Hurling:	0	0	2

Maynooth GAA (Irish: Cumann Lúthchleas Gael Máigh Núad) is a Gaelic Athletic Association (GAA) club in Maynooth, County Kildare, Ireland. It caters for the sporting and social needs of residential areas adjacent to its location for all ages through the promotion of Gaelic games – Gaelic football, hurling, camogie and handball.

Maynooth are the winners of two county senior football championships in 1896 and 1913 and two senior hurling championships in 1937 and 1939. Maynooth footballers have beaten Naas and qualified for the senior county final for the first time since 1916.

== History ==
Entrance arch to Páirc Mhuire, with club crest visible.

Maynooth is one of the oldest clubs in the country and hurling was first played as far back as 1875, nine years before the founding of the GAA in 1884. Maynooth traditionally wearing green, orange and black, were recorded as playing Straffan on 13 March 1887, a game that may not have been the first between the teams. Maynooth were semi-finalists in the very first championship, and won their first Kildare Championship in 1896. The team captain that year was Domhnall ua Buachalla, who subsequently took part in the 1916 rising and afterwards was sent to Knitsford Jail and Frangoch Camp. He was elected to the first Dail in 1918 and he was the last Governor-General of Ireland.

The Maynooth club jersey (black with a white sash) originated from a tragic accident in 1889. A young Maynooth player, Thomas Cullen died after an accidental blow to the head playing against Monastrevin. At the time Maynooth had played 70 matches against teams from Dublin, Louth, Meath, and Kildare, and lost only ten of them.

The motto Crom Abú originated from the war cry of the Fitzgerald family. Croom is a castle in Co. Limerick which formerly belonged to the FitzGeralds. "Abfi" means 'to victory', 'for ever' or literally 'defying' . This is one of the many Irish gathering cries, the use of which was forbidden by repeated Acts of Parliament. The Geraldines of Maynooth retained the motto but were forced by an Act of Parliament to change the motto to "Si Dieu plet Crom Abu". Maynooth GAA have retained the original version which means:- Maynooth to Victory.

== Gaelic Football ==
The men's football Team currently compete in the Kildare Senior Football Championship and in Division One of the Senior League.

Maynooth won the Intermediate Championship in 1999 with a replayed victory over St Kevins. Following one season in Senior Football Maynooth defeated St Kevins again in 2005 (1–11 to 0–04) to win the Intermediate Championship in Newbridge.

The club's senior 'B' Team won the Division 4 League Title in 2008, adding to the Senior 'B' Championship win in 2007. 2009 was a successful year as Maynooth reclaimed their Senior status with victory in the Intermediate championship final over Kilcullen. The team continued their winning ways and claimed a first ever provincial title by defeating Tubberclair (Westmeath) in the same year.

== Hurling ==
Maynooth won the Intermediate Hurling Championship in 1999, a double championship winning year, as the club's footballer's also won the Intermediate Championship. 2009 was another successful year for the club's hurlers as they regained senior status by winning the Intermediate Championship in October, setting up the chance of a double championship year for the club. The Junior Hurlers won the double in 2012 beating Sallins in the League Final in Maynooth and Clane in the Championship Final held in Sallins. Further Intermediate Championships were won in 2011, 2012, 2016, 2020 & 2021. The Junior Hurlers won the League in 2018 beating Broadford in the Final played in Newbridge. Maynooth won their first Minor A Hurling Championship in 2020 defeating Naas 1–19 to 1–9. In 2022 Maynooth, after being promoted from Intermediate the year before, qualified for their first Senior Championship Hurling Final in 81 years where they lost to Naas 0–20 to 0–12.

Maynooth had four players; Cathal McCabe, Daniel O’Meara, David Qualter and Matt Eustace, in the historic Kildare Joe McDonagh winning squad in 2025.

== Honours ==
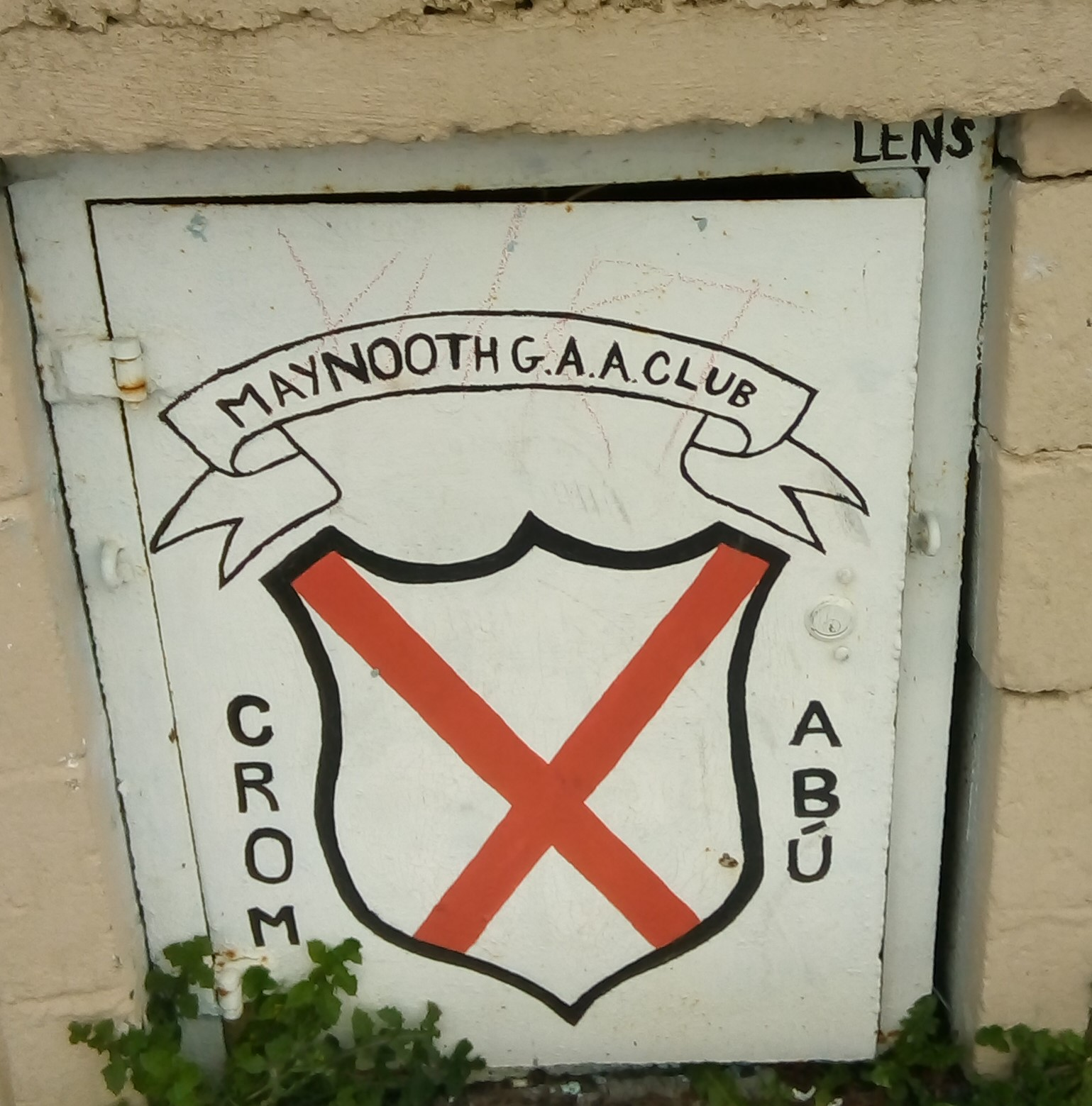
Club crest painted in the town

- Kildare Senior Hurling Championship: (6) 1891, 1896, 1913, 1924, 1937, 1939
- Kildare Senior Football Championship (2) 1896, 1913
- Kildare Senior Hurling Championship: Finalist 2022, 2024
- Kildare Senior Football League (1) 1934
- Kildare Under 23A Hurling Championship (1) 2022
- Kildare Under 23A Football Championship (1) 2022
- Leinster Senior Football Championship Finalists 1896
- Kildare Minor A Hurling Championship(2) 2020, 2025
- Kildare Minor A Hurling Championship Finalists 2019, 2021, 2023, 2024, 2025
- Kildare Minor A Football League (2) 2009, 2021
- Leinster Intermediate Club Football Championship: (1) 2009
- Kildare Intermediate Football Championship: (7) 1936, 1948, 1957, 1965, 1999, 2005, 2009
- Kildare Intermediate B Football Championship (1) 1999
- Kildare Intermediate Hurling Championship (6) 1999, 2009, 2011, 2012, 2016, 2020, 2021
- Kildare Junior Hurling Championship (1) 2012
- Kildare Junior Hurling League (2) 2012, 2018
- Kildare Intermediate Football League (2) 1954, 1955
- Kildare Senior B Football Championship (1) 2007
- Kildare Junior Football Championship: (3) 1912, 1947, 1995
- Leinster Senior Hurling League Division 3 2015
- Leinster Senior Hurling League Division 4 2016
- All Ireland finalists Scor na nÓg 2006 (Rince Foirne)
- Leinster Champions Scor na nÓg 2006 (Rince Foirne)
- All Ireland finalists Scor na nÓg 2009 (Rince Foirne)
- Leinster Champions Scor na nÓg 2009 (Rince Foirne)
- All-Ireland winners Scor Sinsear 2009 (Rince Foirne)
- Leinster Champions Scor Sinsear 2009 (Rince Foirne)
- Leinster Champions Scor na nÓg 2013 (Tráth na gceist)
- Leinster Champions Scor na nÓg 2013 (Rince Foirne)

== Bibliography ==
- Maynooth GAA Club History, 1966.
- Kildare GAA: A Centenary History, by Eoghan Corry, CLG Chill Dara, 1984, ISBN 0-9509370-0-2 hb ISBN 0-9509370-1-0 pb
- Kildare GAA yearbook, 1972, 1974, 1978, 1979, 1980 and 2000– in sequence especially the Millennium yearbook of 2000
- Soaring Sliothars: Centenary of Kildare Camogie 1904–2004 by Joan O'Flynn Kildare County Camogie Board.
