= Celbridge GAA =

Gaelic games club in County Kildare, Ireland

- Cill Droichid
- Founded: 1885
- County: Kildare
- Colours: Blue & White Alternate: Red & Black
- Grounds: Hazelhatch Road, Celbridge.
- Coordinates: 53.327413°N 6.525570°W

Playing kits
Standard colours

Senior Club Championships
	All Ireland	Leinster champions	Kildare champions
Football:	0	0	1
Hurling:	0	0	8
Camogie:	0	0	5

Celbridge is a Gaelic Athletic Association club in Celbridge, County Kildare, Ireland. They were awarded Kildare GAA club of the year in 2008, winners of the Kildare senior football championship of 2008, finalists in the senior football league of 1923, 1988 and 2008 and won the Kildare senior hurling and camogie championships in 2005. The club has also won several honours at underage levels in all three codes, qualifying for national finals in football, hurling and camogie at the 2008 Féile.

== History ==
Celbridge GAA club was formed in July 1885. In the early 1990s, a new executive committee began the task of raising funds to build the present club house.

== Gaelic football ==
Barney Rock managed the Celbridge team when they won their first ever Kildare Senior Football Championship in 2008, defeating Newbridge Sarsfields by 1–10 to 0–11. Celbridge won the 1922 Junior F final and first played in the final of the Leinster Leader Cup of 1923, played in 1924. Owen 'Skipper' Murphy captained the team which won the Intermediate championship in 1936. Martin Byrne was selected for Kildare after that win. Celbridge played senior football again in the late 1980s after a victory in the 1987 Intermediate championship and reached the 1989 county semi-final by a point to Clane. Area side with Celbridge, St Wolstan's fought a semi-final battle with Ballyteague in 1974 that took three matches to decide and another in 1975 with Clane that took two matches. They also lost the 1976 quarter-final in a replay. Shelbourne F.C.'s youth international soccer player Vincent McKenna lined out with St. Wolstan's, and scored an equaliser in that first semi-final against Ballyteague. Celbridge contested the 2008 SFL Division One final for the first time in two decades, losing only one game throughout the series, winning twelve and drawing three.

Former Clare manager Micheál McDermott was appointed in November 2022.

== Hurling ==
Celbridge has won eight senior hurling Championships in Kildare. On 2 October 2011, Celbridge completed a three-in-a-row of championship titles when they beat local rivals Confey 2–16 to 0–15. In 2009 and 2010, they beat Coill Dubh in both finals. Their previous successes dates back to 1921 and then again in 2005, with Jimmy Doyle as team manager in 2005. In the interim, between 2005 and 2009, the team missed out narrowly in three county semi-finals. The club have had three Kildare "hurler of the year" winners, Donal Moloney (2005), Tony Murphy (2009) and Mark Moloney (2010). In previous years, Billy White, Tony Murphy, Mattie O' Dowd and Niall O' Muineachain have won Christy Ring all-star awards. Billy White was nominated for Christy Ring Hurler of the Year in 2007. The senior hurlers were also crowned All-Ireland Intermediate Elevens Champions in 2011. Celbridge went on to win senior county titles in 2013, 2016, and 2018. The club's first minor title was won in 2000. Celbridge were named Kildare Hurling Club of the year 2010.

== Camogie ==
Celbridge's camogie team was formed by Fr Val Martin in 1953 but lapsed 1972-1977 and 1989–1995. The club joined with Straffan in 1961, and won the 1962 junior championship. In 1977, the club revived and won the junior league in 1978 and junior championship and league double in 1985. St Wolstan's play in Dublin colleges competition. Bridget Cushen was selected on the Kildare camogie team of the century. Senior and u-21 championship winners 2005. Celbridge won the 2006 senior championship and narrowly missed out on a "three-in-a-row" after defeat in the 2007 decider to St Laurences. Susan O'Carroll and Deirdre Corcoran have been nominated for national All-Stars while O'Carroll was named on the Ashbourne Cup All-Stars, while playing for the University College Dublin team in 2007 and 2008.

== Honours ==
Titles won by the club have included:

- Kildare Senior Football Championship: (1) 2008
- Kildare Senior Hurling Championship: (8) 1921, 2005, 2009, 2010, 2011 2013, 2016, 2018
- Kildare Senior Football League Division 1: (1) 2014
- Kildare Senior Football League Division 2: (1) 2002
- Kildare Senior Hurling League 2003, 2006, 2010, 2011, 2012
- Kildare Intermediate Football Championship: (2) 1987, 2002
- Kildare Intermediate Hurling Championship (3) 2007, 2008, 2013
- Kildare Intermediate Hurling League (8) 1993, 2005, 2006, 2007, 2008, 2009, 2011, 2014
- Kildare Senior Football league Div.7 (1) 2008
- Kildare Under 21 Football Championship: (3) 2005, 2012, 2014
- Kildare U-21 Hurling Championship (5) 2003, 2005, 2007, 2014, 2015
- Kildare Minor Hurling Champions (7) 2000, 2001, 2002, 2004, 2005, 2011, 2012
- Kildare Minor Hurling League (1) 2012
- Kildare Minor Football Championship (2) 2011,2020
- Kildare Minor Football League Div. 1 (3) 2010, 2011 & 2012
- Kildare Junior Football Championship (3) 1923, 1958, 1986
- Kildare Junior Hurling Championship (2) 1991, 2002
- Kildare Junior Camogie championship (4) 1962, 2000 (combined with Straffan), 1985, 2001,
- Kildare Junior Camogie League(2) 1985, 2000
- Kildare Senior Camogie League (4) 2007, 2008, 2010, 2014
- Kildare Minor Camogie Championship (3) 2012, 2013, 2014
- Kildare U-21 Camogie Championship (6) 2002, 2003, 2005, 2006, 2011, 2013
- Kildare Senior Camogie Championship (5) 2005, 2006, 2010, 2020, 2021

== Bibliography ==
- Celbridge GAA by Darragh MacIntyre (Celbridge GAA 1984)
- Kildare GAA: A Centenary History, by Eoghan Corry, CLG Chill Dara, 1984, ISBN 0-9509370-0-2 hb ISBN 0-9509370-1-0 pb
- Kildare GAA yearbook, 1972, 1974, 1978, 1979, 1980 and 2000– in sequence especially the Millennium yearbook of 2000
- Soaring Sliothars: Centenary of Kildare Camogie 1904–2004 by Joan O'Flynn Kildare County Camogie Board.
- Celbridge GAA Millennium Yearbook 2000, by John Moriarity
- Celbridge GAA Yearbook, by Niall Lanigan 2002, 2003, 2004, 2005, 2006, 2008, 2009
