= Burke =

- Blazon: Or, a cross gules
- Pronunciation: /bərk/ Irish: [ˈbuːɾˠk]
- Language: English / Irish

Origin
- Language: French
- Derivation: de Burgh (de Búrca / Búrc)
- Meaning: "of the borough"
- Region of origin: England, Ireland

Other names
- Variant forms: Bourke, Burgo/de Burgo, de Bourgh
- Anglicisation: Burgh

Burke (Irish: de Búrca; Latin: de Burgo) is a Norman-Irish surname, deriving from the ancient Anglo-Norman and Hiberno-Norman noble dynasty, the House of Burgh. In Ireland, the descendants of William de Burgh (circa 1160–1206) had the surname de Burgh, which was gaelicised in Irish as de Búrca and over the centuries became Búrc, then Burke, and Bourke.

Notable people with this name include:

== Surname ==
=== A ===
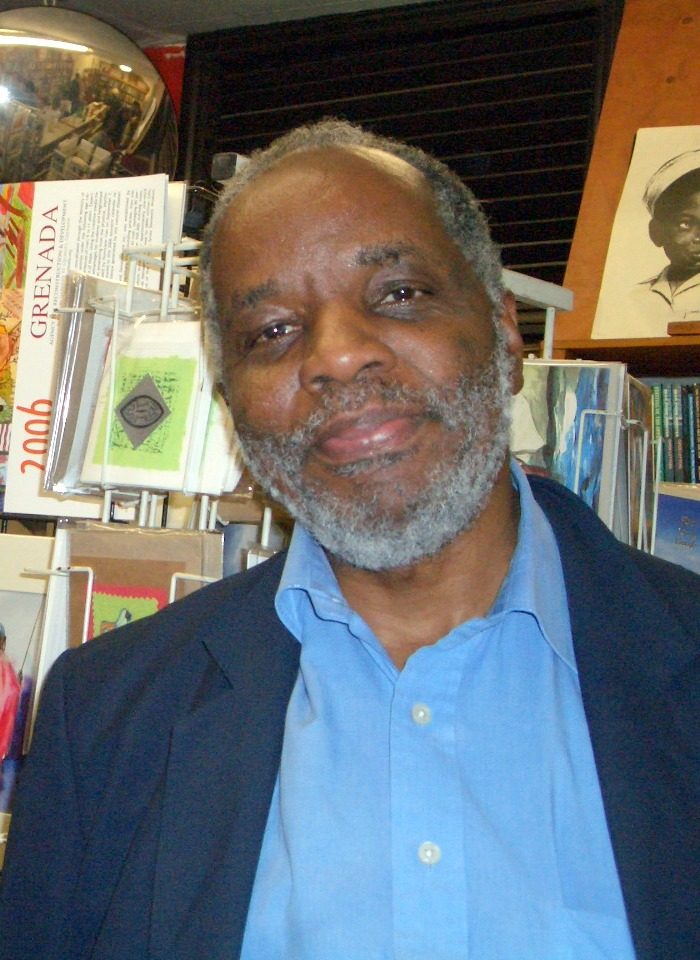
Aggrey Burke

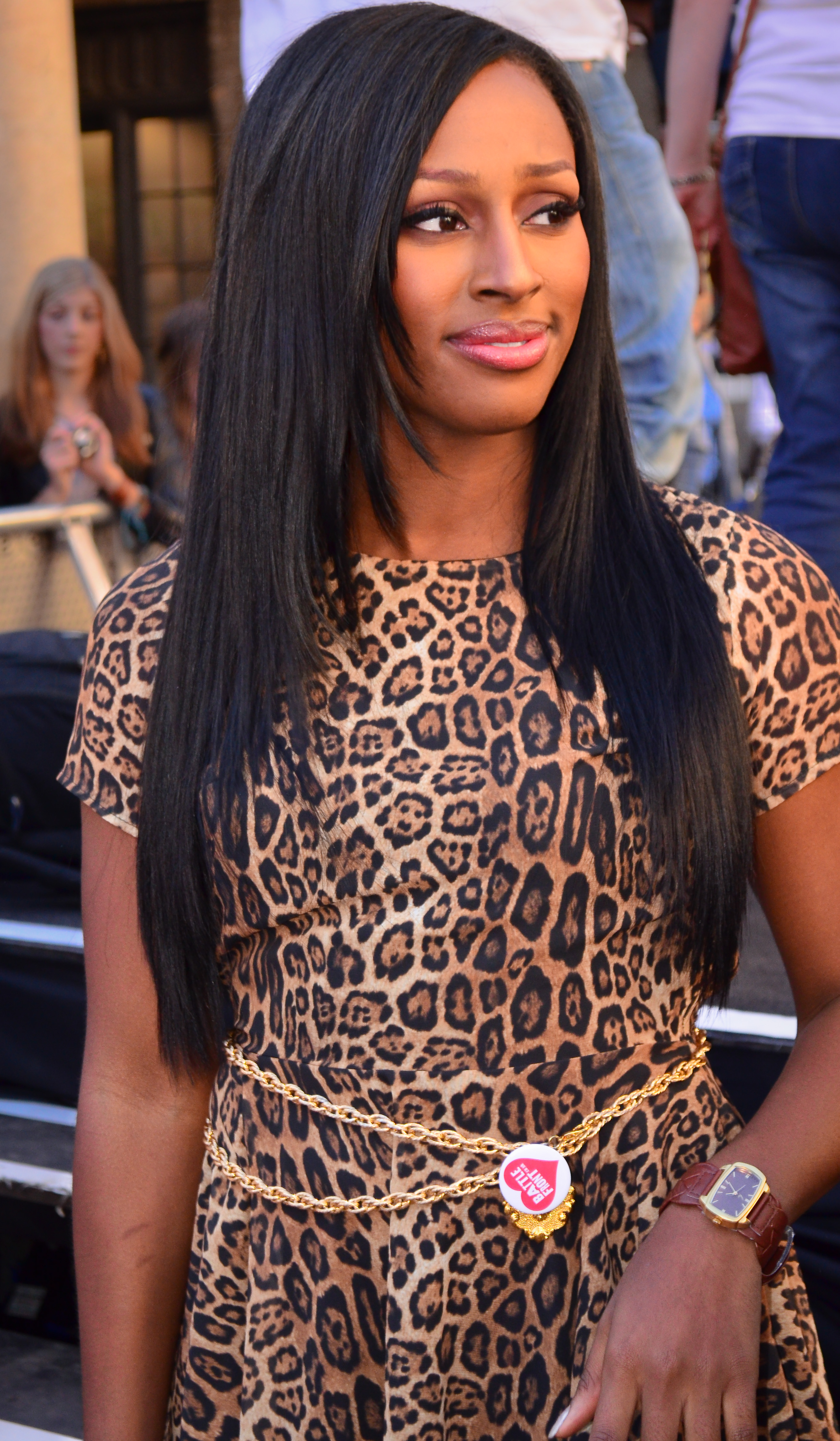
Alexandra Burke

- Adam Burke (disambiguation), multiple people, including:
  - Adam Burke (rower), (1971–2018), Irish ocean rower
  - Adam Burke (comedian), American stand-up comedian, writer, and comic artist
- Adrian P. Burke (1904–2000), American jurist from New York
- Aedanus Burke (1743–1802), Irish-American soldier, judge, and politician
- Aggrey Burke (1943–2025), British psychiatrist and academic
- Alafair Burke (born 1969), mystery novel writer and Court TV commentator
- Alan Burke (1922–1992), American conservative television and radio talk show host
- Alan Burke (director) (1923–2007), Australian writer and film director and producer
- Albert Burke (disambiguation), multiple people, including:
  - Albert E. Burke (1919–1999), American professor and public educational television pioneer
  - Albert Burke (tennis) (1901–1958), Irish tennis player
- Alex Burke (born 1977), Scottish footballer
- Alexander Burke (born 1983), American musician, producer, writer and actor
- Alexandra Burke (born 1988), British singer, songwriter and actress
- Alfred Burke (1918–2011), British actor, Public Eye
- Alice Burke (politician) (1892–1974), American politician
- Alice Burke (footballer), (born 2002), Australian footballer
- Alicia Burke, Jamaican fashion model
- Montel Vontavious Porter or Alvin Antonio Burke Jr or Hassan Hamin Assad (born 1973), wrestler
- Ambrose Burke (1895–1998), English professor and Catholic priest
- Andrew Burke (disambiguation), multiple people, including:
  - Andrew H. Burke (1850–1918), American politician from North Dakota
  - Andrew Burke (poet) (1944–2023), Australian poet
  - Andrew Burke (sailor) (1949–2009), Barbadian sailor
- Angela Brown-Burke, Jamaican politician
- Anna Burke (born 1966), Australian politician
- Anne Burke (disambiguation), multiple people, including:
  - Anne Burke (writer) (fl.1780–1805), Irish novelist
  - Anne M. Burke (born 1944), American jurist from Illinois
- Anthony D. Burke (born 1966), Australian political theorist and international relations scholar
- Antoine Burke (born 1975), Irish athlete
- Antonee Burke-Gilroy (born 1997), English-born Australian football player
- Antonella Gambotto-Burke or Antonella Gambotto (born 1965), Italian-Australian author and journalist
- Aoife de Búrca (1885–1974), born Eva Burke, Red Cross nurse during the Irish Easter Rising
- Arizona John Burke, see John Burke
- Arleigh Burke or Arleigh Albert Burke (1901–1996), American admiral
- Augustus Nicholas Burke (1838–1891), Irish painter
- Austin-Emile Burke (1922–2011), Canadian Catholic prelate
- Autumn Burke (born 1973), American politician

=== B ===
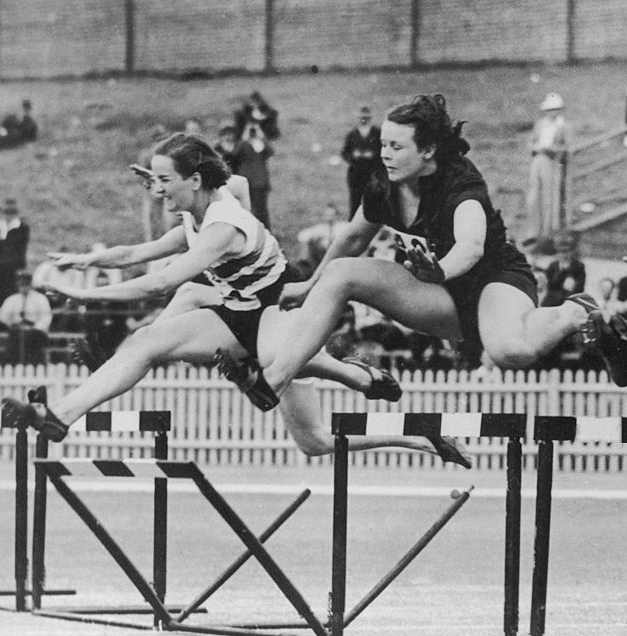
Barbara Burke

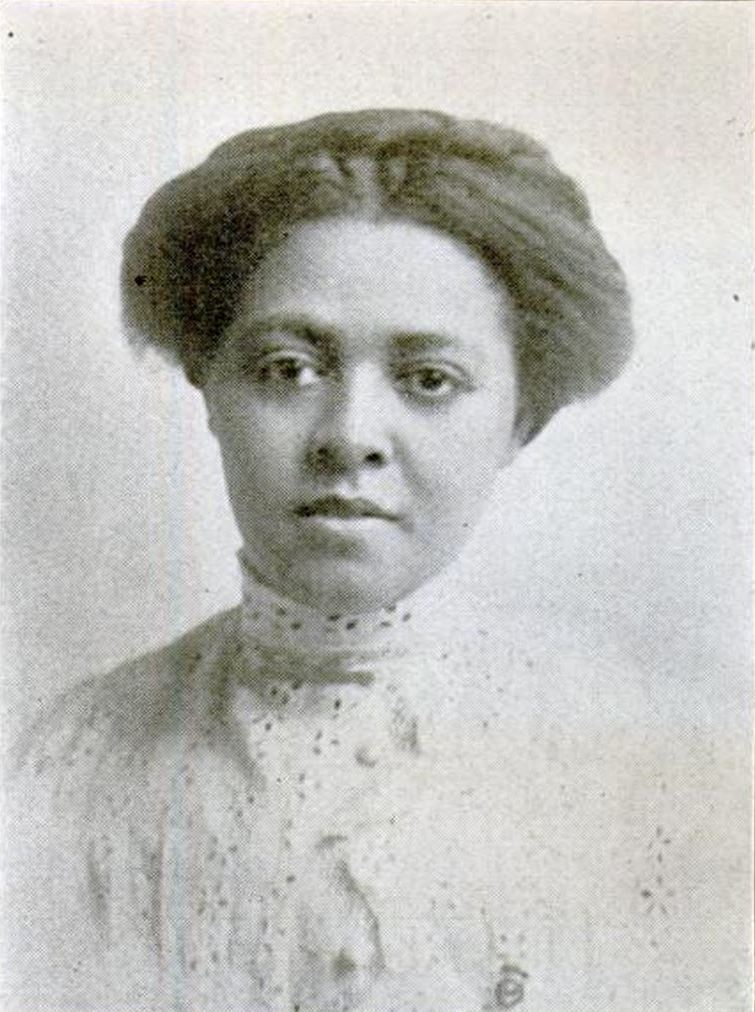
Bessie Burke

- Barbara Burke (1917–1998), British and South African sprint runner
- Barbara Burke Hubbard (born 1948), American science writer
- Bernard Burke (1814–1892), British genealogist, editor of Burke's Peerage
- Bernie Burke, American ice hockey player
- Berny Burke (born 1996), Costa Rican footballer
- Bessie Burke (1891–1968), African American teacher
- Beulah Burke (1885–1975), American founder of the first African-American sorority
- Bill Burke (athlete) (born 1969), American middle-distance runner
- Billy Burke (disambiguation), multiple people, including:
  - Billy Burke (actor) (born 1966), American actor
  - Billy Burke (golfer) (1902–1972), golfer
  - Billy Burke (baseball) (1889–1967), baseball player
  - Billy Burke (hurler) (1912–1995), Irish hurler
  - Billy Burke (firefighter) (1955–2001), died when the World Trade Centers collapsed
  - Billy Burke (criminal) or "Billy the Kid" (1858–1919), American gangster
  - Bill Burke (athlete) (born 1969), American middle-distance runner
  - Bill Burke (photographer) (born 1943), American documentary photographer
  - Billie Burke (1884–1970), American actress
  - Willie Burke (born 1972), Irish footballer
- Bobby Burke (1907–1971), American baseball player
- Bobby Burke (footballer), (born 1934), Northern Irish footballer
- Brendan Burke (1988–2010), American athlete
- Brendan Burke (soccer), (born 1982), American soccer coach
- Brendan Burke (sportscaster), (born 1984) American sportscaster
- Brian Burke (disambiguation), multiple people, including:
  - Brian Burke (Australian politician) (born 1947), Australian politician from Western Australia
  - Brian Burke (American politician) (born 1958), American politician from Wisconsin
  - Brian Burke (ice hockey) (born 1955), American ice hockey executive
  - Brian Burke (American football) (born 1935), American football player and coach
  - Brian Burke (Gaelic footballer) (born 1966), Irish Gaelic footballer
- Brock Burke (born 1996), American baseball pitcher
- Brooke Burke (born 1971), actress and model
- Bryan Burke (born 1989), American soccer player
- Byron Burke, American record producer

=== C ===
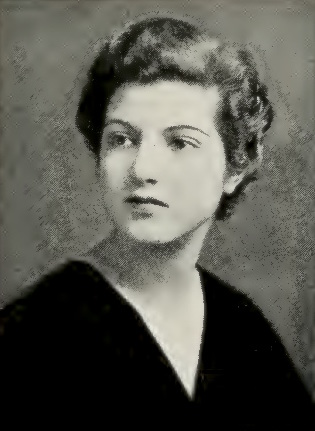
Caroline Burke

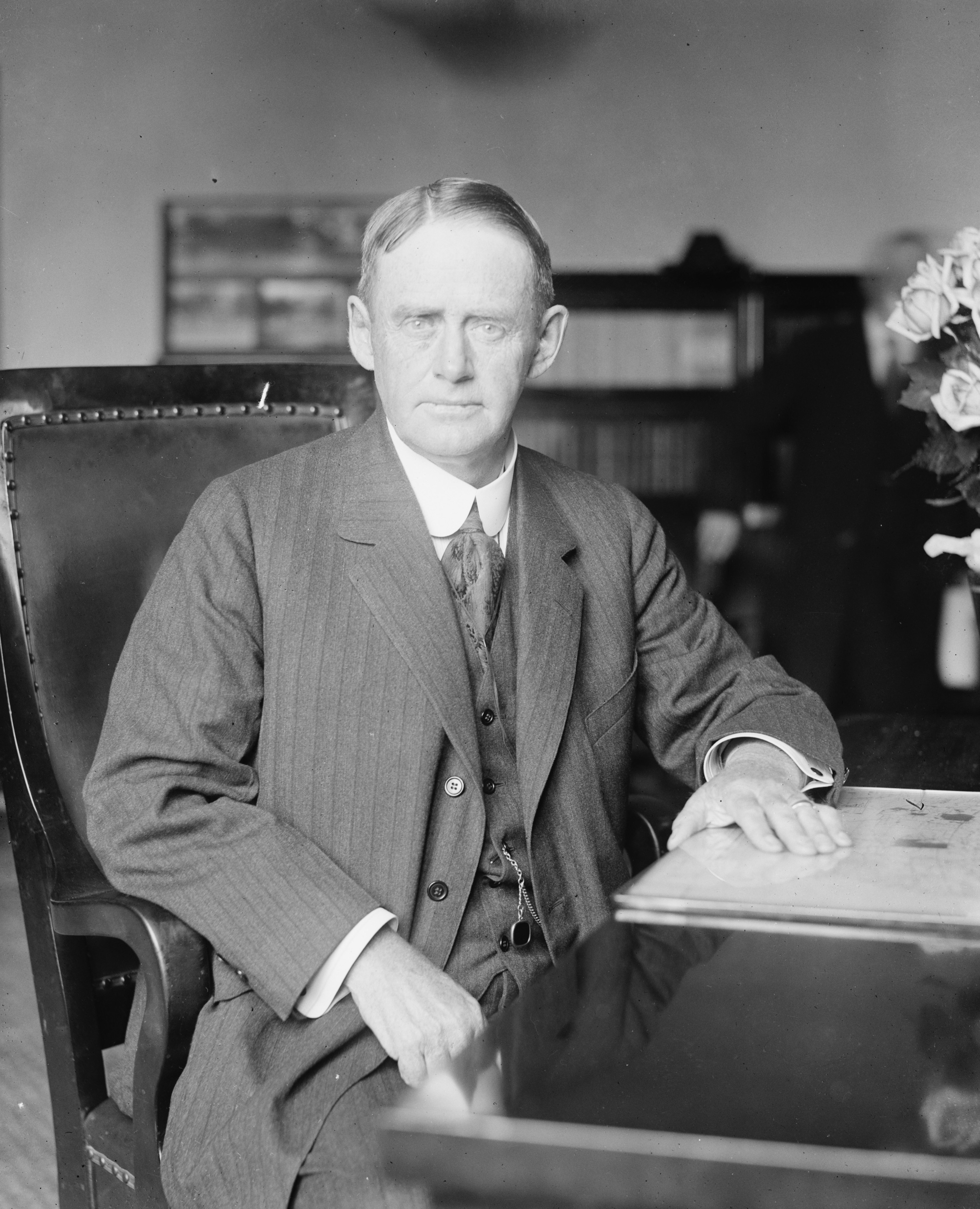
Charles H. Burke

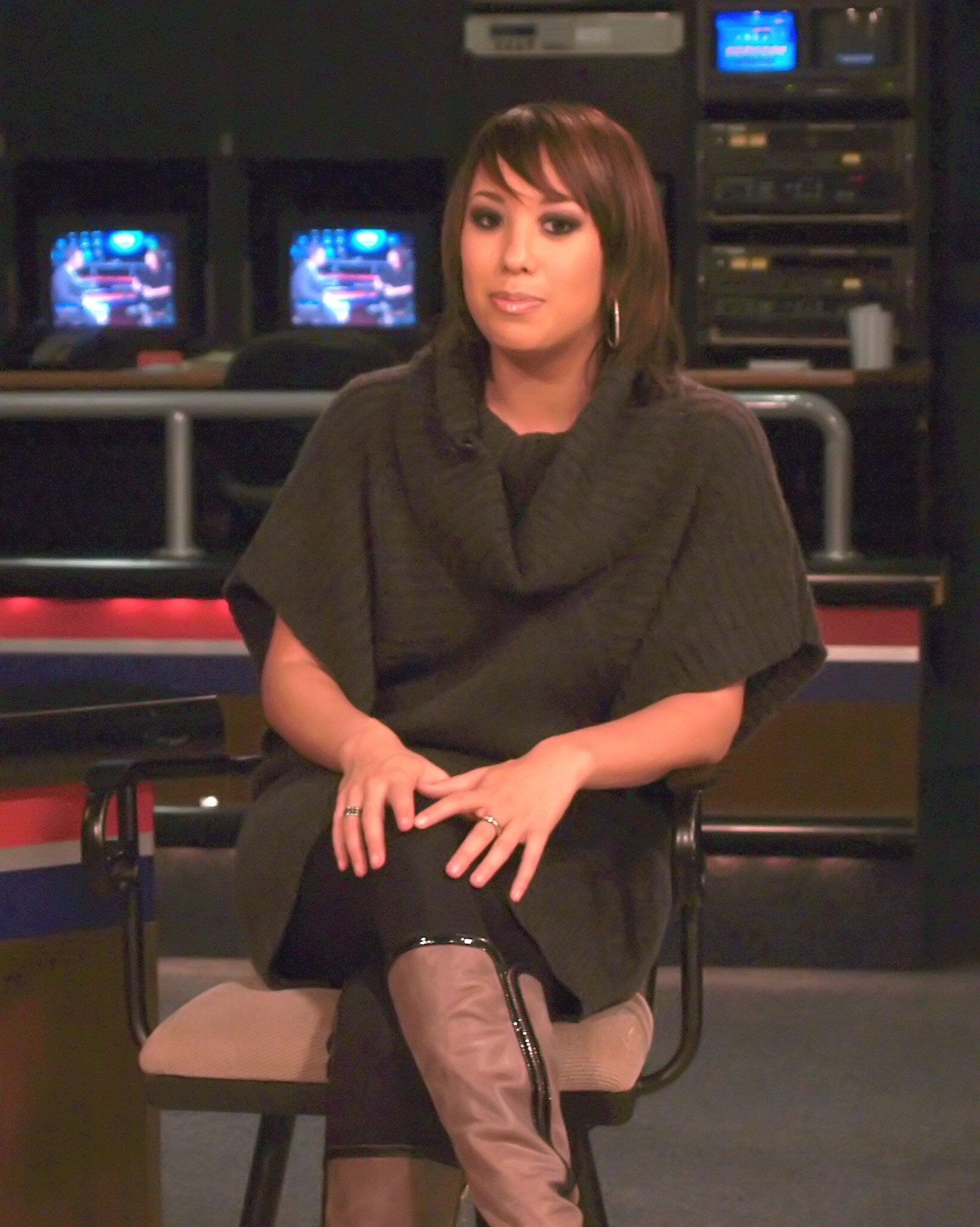
Cheryl Burke

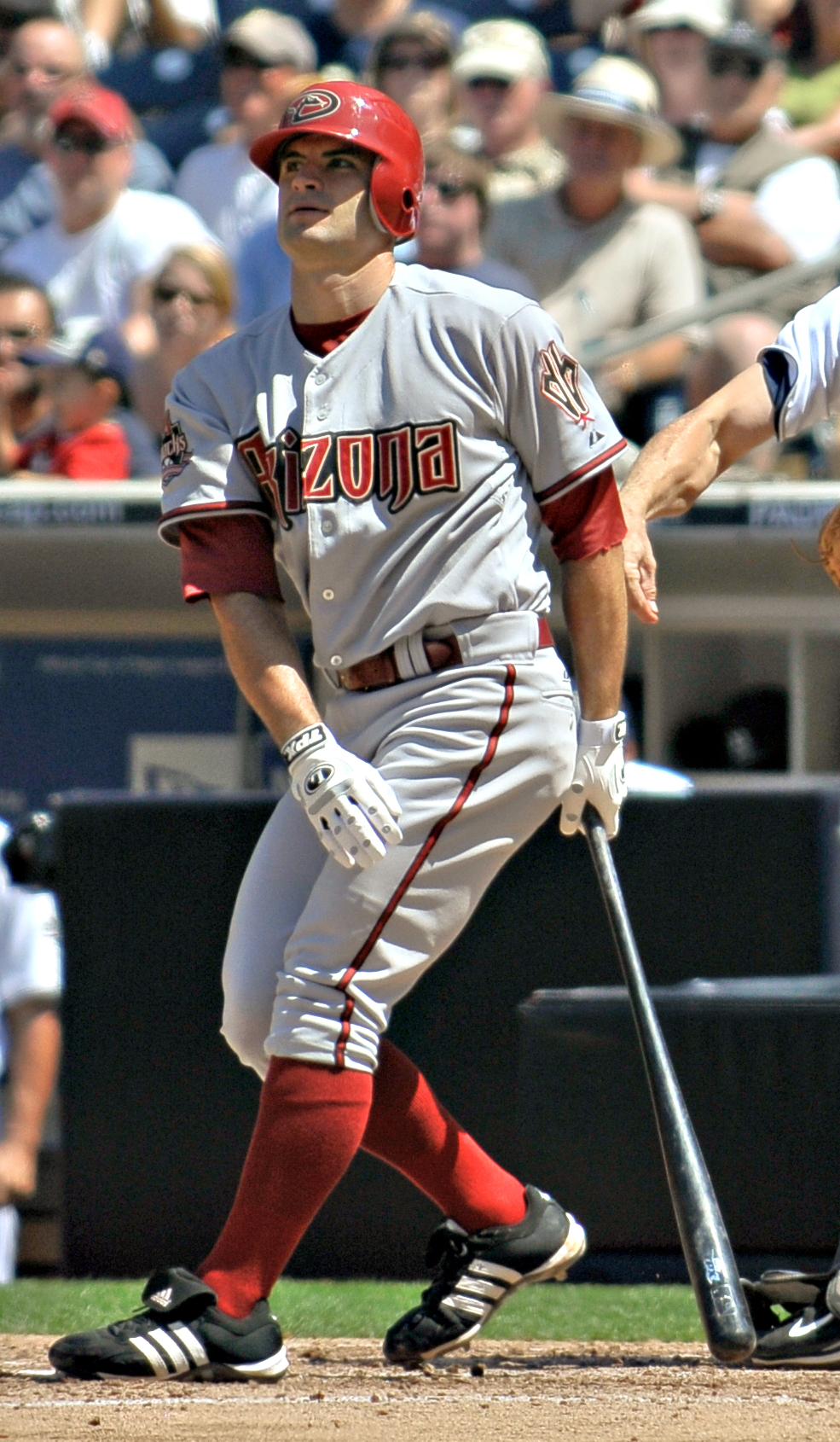
Chris Burke

- Callahan Burke (born 1997), American ice hockey player
- Cam Burke (born 1987), Canadian golfer
- Caroline Burke (1913–1964), American actress, producer, writer, and art collector
- Carolyn Burke (born 1940), Australian-born American translator, art critic, and author
- Catherine Burke (disambiguation), multiple people, including:
  - Kathy Burke (born 1964), British actress
  - Katherine Alice Burke (1875–1924), British chemist
- Ceelle Burke, American musician and performer
- Ces Burke (1914–1997), New Zealand cricketer
- Chand Burke (1932–2008), Indian actress
- Charles Burke (disambiguation), multiple people, including:
  - Charles H. Burke (1861–1944), American politician
  - Charles Burke (British Army officer) (1882–1917)
  - Charlie Burke, Hong Kong cricket coach
  - Chuck Burke (born 1930), American speed skater
- Cheryl Burke (born 1984), American dancer
- Chesya Burke, American editor, educator and author
- Chris Burke (disambiguation), multiple people, including:
  - Christopher Burke (Irish revolutionary) (1898–1964), Irish revolutionary, hunger striker and sportsman
  - Chris Burke (actor) (born 1965), American actor and folk singer
  - Chris Burke (baseball) (born 1980), baseball player
  - Chris Burke (footballer) (born 1983), Scottish footballer
  - Christopher Burke (design writer), (born 1967), typeface designer and author on typography
  - Christopher Burke, guitarist with Beach Fossils
  - Christopher Burke, astronomer Ursa Minor Dwarf
  - Chris Burke (priest), (born 1965), Vice-Dean and Canon Precentor of Sheffield Cathedral, and Archdeacon-designate of Barking
  - Chris Burke-Gaffney, Canadian songwriter and producer
- Christie Burke (born 1989), Canadian actress
- Christy Burke, Irish politician
- Ciarán Burke (born 1999), Irish hurler
- Clarence Burke Jr (1949–2013), American singer and member of the Five Stairsteps
- Clem Burke (1954–2025), American drummer for the group Blondie
- Colm Burke (born 1957), Irish politician
- Conor Burke (disambiguation), multiple people, including:
  - Conor Burke (rugby union), (born 1974), Irish rugby player
  - Conor Burke (hurler), (born 1998), Irish hurler
  - Conor Burke (baseball), American baseball player and coach
- Cormac Burke (footballer), (born 1993), Northern Irish footballer
- Cory Burke (born 1991), Jamaican footballer
- Courtney Burke (born 1994), American ice hockey player
- Cyril Burke (Australian rules footballer), (1905–1984), Australian footballer
- Cyril Burke (1925–2010), Australian rugby player

=== D ===
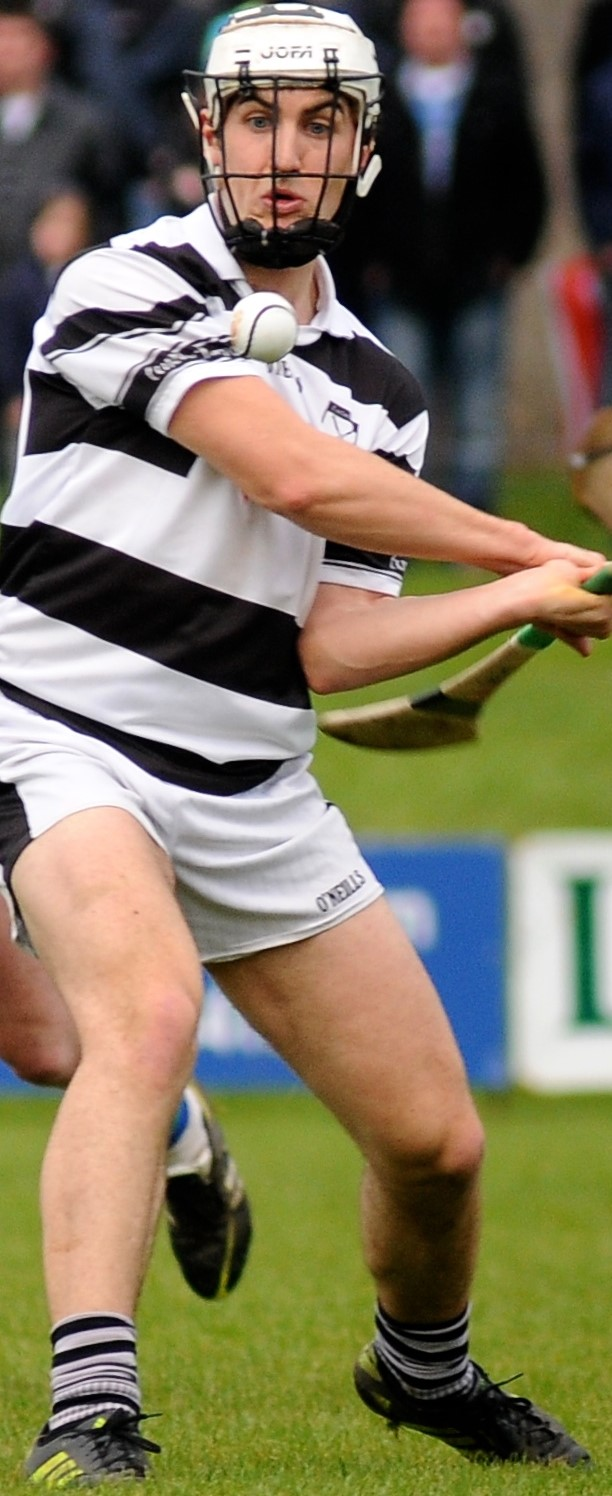
Daithí Burke

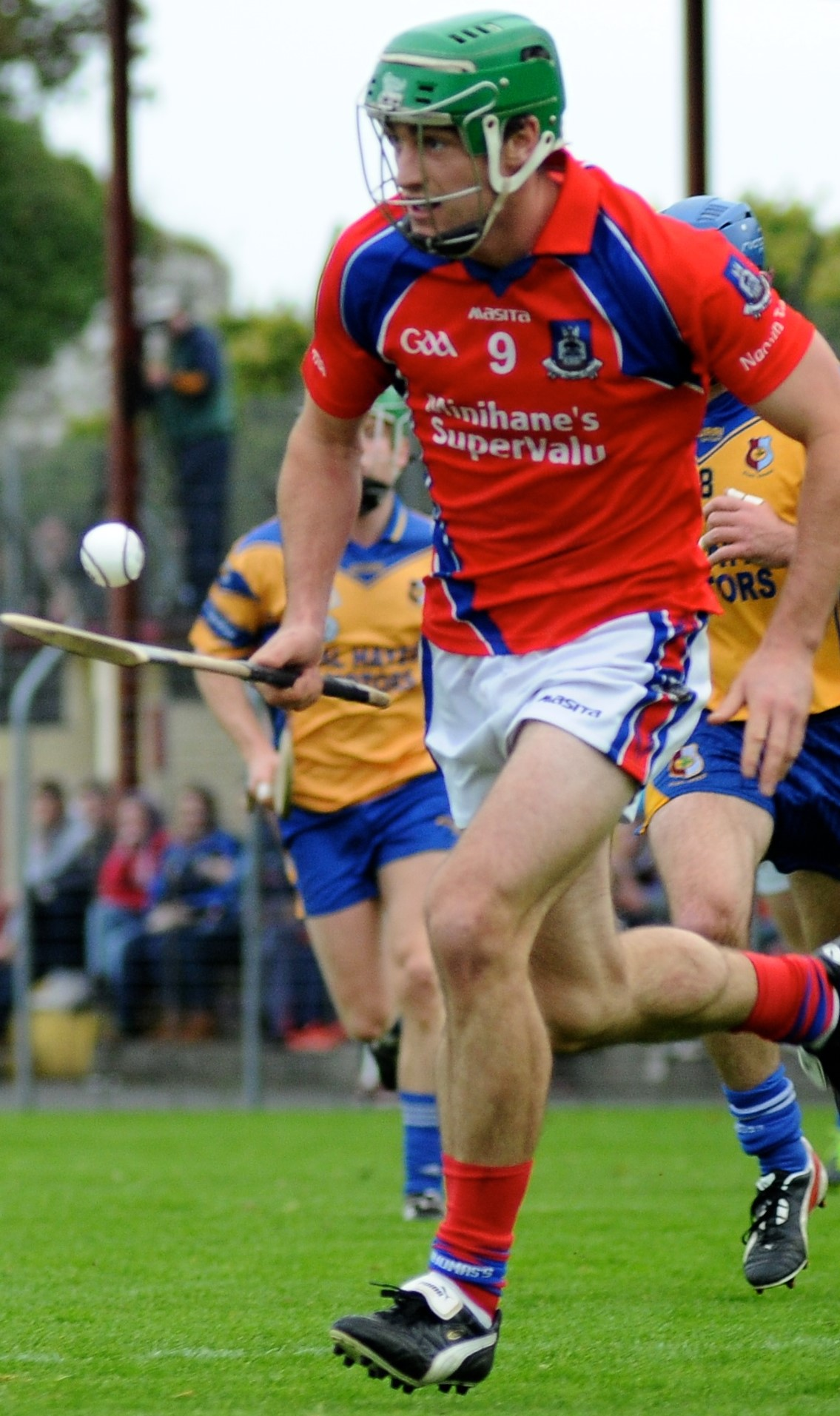
David Burke

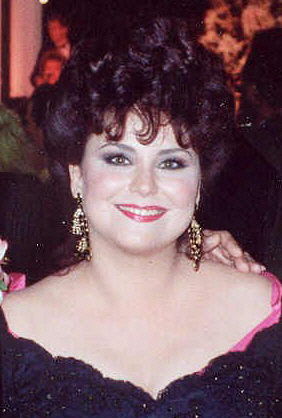
Delta Burke

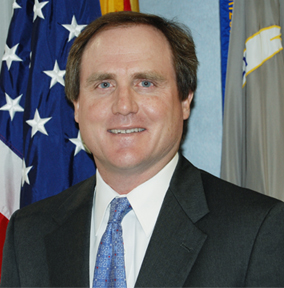
Dennis K. Burke

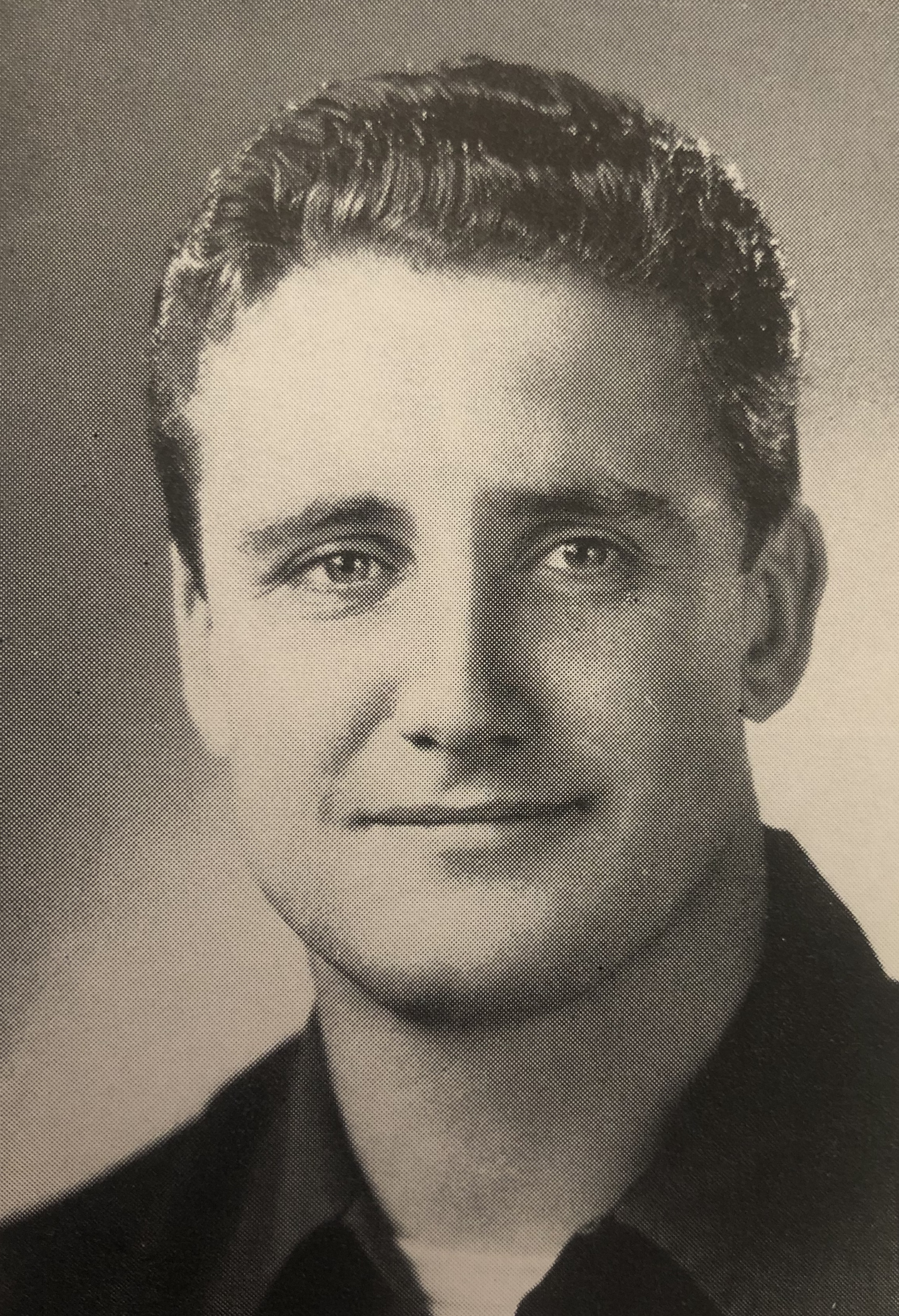
Don Burke

- Daithí Burke (born 1992) is an Irish hurler and Gaelic footballer
- Dan Burke (disambiguation), multiple people, including:
  - Dan Burke (baseball) (1868–1933), MLB utility player
  - Dan Burke (basketball) (born 1959), NBA assistant coach
  - Daniel Burke (executive) (1929–2011), former president of Capital Cities Communications and American Broadcasting Corporation
  - Daniel J. Burke (born 1951), former Democratic member of the Illinois House of Representatives
- Daniel Burke (disambiguation), multiple people, including:
  - Daniel J. Burke (born 1951), former Democratic member of the Illinois House of Representatives
  - Dan Burke (baseball) (1868–1933), Major League Baseball player
  - Daniel Burke (Australian politician) (1827–1927), member of the Tasmanian House of Assembly
  - Daniel Burke (executive) (1929–2011), former president of the American Broadcasting Corporation
  - Daniel Burke (rower) (born 1974), Australian rower
  - Daniel W. Burke (1841–1911), American soldier and Medal of Honor recipient
- Dave Burke (disambiguation), multiple people, including:
  - David Burke (politician) (born 1967), Ohio politician
  - Dave Burke (Australian footballer) (1916–1987), Australian rules footballer
- David Burke (disambiguation), multiple people, including:
  - David Burke (British actor) (1934–2026), British actor
  - David Burke (American actor) (born 1967), American television actor
  - David Burke (author), language books author
  - David J. Burke (born 1948), producer, screenwriter and film and television director
  - David Burke (Australian footballer) (born 1959), Australian rules footballer
  - David Burke (English footballer) (born 1960), English footballer
  - David Burke (boxer) (born 1975), English boxer
  - David Burke (Galway hurler) (born 1990), Irish hurler for Galway
  - David Burke (Kilkenny hurler) (born 1981), Irish hurler for Kilkenny and Wexford
  - Davy Burke (born 1988), Irish Gaelic football manager and former player
  - David Burke (politician) (born 1967), member of the Ohio House of Representatives
  - David Burke (botanist) (1854–1897), English botanist
  - David Burke (chef) (born 1962), chef and restaurateur
  - David W. Burke (1935–2014), American television news executive
  - David A. Burke (1952–1987), American hijacker and former employee who caused the crash of Pacific Southwest Airlines Flight 1771
  - David Burke (neurophysiologist) (born 1944), Australian expert in spinal and brain trauma
- Dean Burke or Kenneth Dean Burke (born 1957), American Republican politician and member of the Georgia State Senate
- Declan Burke (born 1972), Irish musician
- Delta Burke (born 1956), American actress and producer
- Denis Burke (disambiguation), multiple people, including:
  - Denis Burke (Irish politician) (1904–1971), Irish politician, senator (1948–1961)
  - Denis Burke (Australian politician) (born 1948), Australian politician, Chief Minister of the Northern Territory (1999–2001)
  - Dennis K. Burke (born 1962), U.S. Attorney for the District of Arizona (2009–2011)
- Denzel Burke (born 2002), American football player
- Desmond Lardner-Burke (1909–1984), politician in Rhodesia
- Dominic Burke (disambiguation), multiple people, including:
  - Dominic Burke (Dominican) (c. 1603 – 1649), Irish Dominican priest and political agent
  - Dominic Burke (bishop) (1639–1704), Irish Roman Catholic Bishop of Elphin from 1671 to 1704
  - Dominick Burke (died 1747), Irish politician
  - Dominic Burke (businessman) (born 1958), British businessman
- Don Burke (disambiguation), multiple people, including:
  - Don Burke (born 1947) is an Australian television presenter and horticulturist
  - Donald Burke, an American infectious diseases researcher
  - Don Burke (American football) (1926–2009), an American football player
- Donal Burke (born 1998), Irish hurler
- Donna Burke, Australian singer, voice actress and businesswoman
- Donna Burke (luger), (born 1954), American luger
- Doris Burke or Doris Sable, American sports announcer and analyst
- Douglas Burke (disambiguation), multiple people, including:
  - Doug Burke (tennis) (born 1963), Jamaican professional tennis player
  - Doug Burke (water polo) (born 1957), American Olympic water polo player

=== E ===
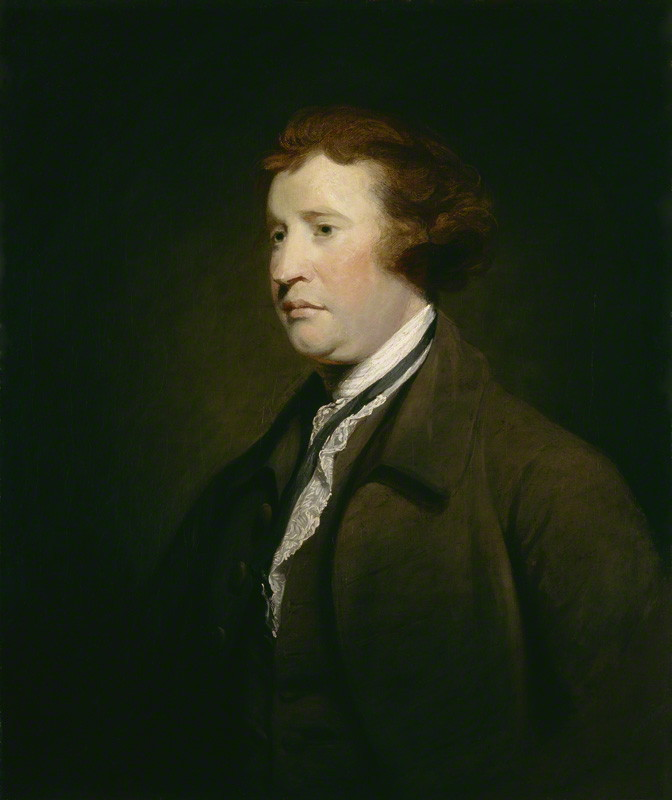
Edmund Burke

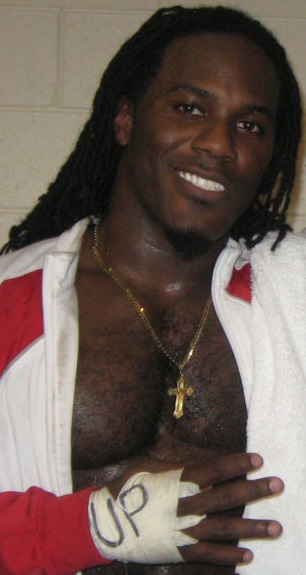
Elijah Burke

- Éanna Burke (born 1995), Irish hurler
- Edmond W. Burke (1935–2020), American jurist
- Edmund Burke (disambiguation), multiple people, including:
  - Edmund Burke (1729–1797), Anglo-Irish statesman and political philosopher
  - Edmond de Burgh (or de Burke) (1298–1338), Irish knight
  - Edmund Bourke (1761–1821), Danish statesman
  - Edmund Burke (congressman) (1809–1882), U.S. Representative for New Hampshire
  - Edmund Burke (architect) (1850–1919), Canadian architect
  - Edmund Burke III (born 1940), U.S. historian
  - Edmund Burke Fairfield (1821–1904), American minister, educator and politician
  - E. Michael Burke (1916–1987), U.S. intelligence officer and business executive
  - Eddie Burke (1905–1993), Canadian ice hockey player
- Edward Burke (disambiguation), multiple people, including:
  - Edward A. Burke (1839–1928), Louisiana State Treasurer
  - Edward T. Burke (1870–1935), North Dakota Supreme Court justice
  - Edward J. Burke (1876–1935), Wisconsin legislator
  - Edward R. Burke (1880–1968), American politician
  - Edward M. Burke (born 1943), Chicago, Illinois Alderman
  - Eddie Burke (baseball) (1866–1907), American baseball player
  - Edward Burke (American football) (1907–1967), selected to the 1928 College Football All-America Team
  - Edward Burke (cricketer) (born 1870, date of death unknown), Jamaican cricketer
  - Ed Burke (hammer thrower) (born 1940), hammer thrower, American flagbearer at 1984 Olympic games
  - Edward Burke (basketball) (1945–2009), American basketball coach
  - Edward Burke (priest) (1847–1915), priest, president of Carlow College, and founder of St. Joseph's Academy
  - Ed Burke (musician) (1909–1988), American musician
  - Ted Burke (1877–1967), Australian rules footballer
- Edwin J. Burke (1889–1944), American screenwriter
- Eileen O'Neill Burke, American lawyer, politician, and judge
- Elena Burke or Romana Elena Burgues Gonzalez (1928–2002), Cuban singer
- Elijah Burke (born 1981), American professional wrestler
- Elizabeth Burke (disambiguation), multiple people, including:
  - Elizabeth Burke-Plunkett, née Elizabeth Burke (1862–1944), an Irish activist
  - Betty Burke, alias of Bonnie Prince Charlie
- Elmer "Trigger" Burke (1917–1958), American hitman
- Ernest Burke (1924–2004), American baseball player
- Ethan Burke (born 2003), American football player

=== F ===
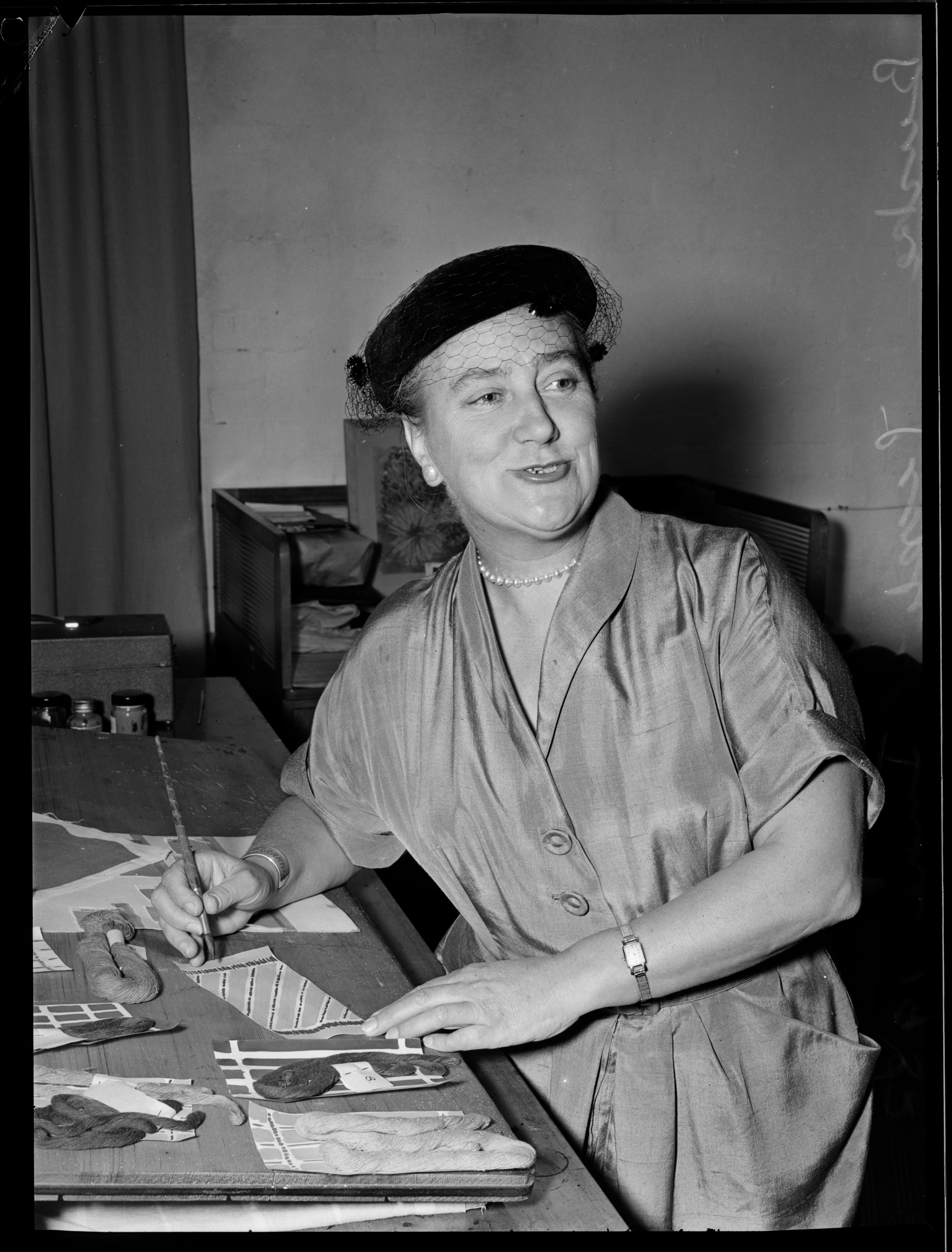
Frances Mary Burke

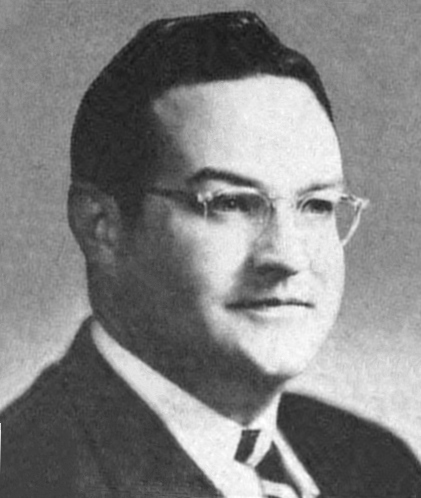
Frank W. Burke

- Fergus Burke (born 1999), New Zealand rugby union player
- Fintan Burke (born 1997), Irish hurler
- Florrie Burke (1918–1995), Irish footballer
- Florrie R. Burke, American human rights advocate
- Frances Burke (disambiguation), multiple people, including:
  - Frances Burke, Countess of Clanricarde (1567–1633), English noblewoman
  - Frances Marie Burke (1922–2017), Miss America 1940
  - Frances Mary Burke (1904–1994) was an Australian artist
- Francis Burke (disambiguation), multiple people, including:
  - Francis Burke (Franciscan) (died 1697), Irish Franciscan friar and writer
  - Francis Burke (bishop) (died 1723), Irish Roman Catholic archbishop of Tuam
  - Francis Burke (Dean of Elphin) (1834–1904), priest of the Church of Ireland
- Frank Burke (disambiguation), multiple people, including:
  - Frank Burke (United States Army officer) (1918–1988), American Army officer and Medal of Honor recipient
  - Frank G. Burke (1927–2015), Acting Archivist of the United States
  - Frank W. Burke (1920–2007), American politician
  - Frank Burke (Australian politician) (1876–1949), Speaker of the New South Wales Legislative Assembly
  - Frank Burke (baseball) (1880–1946), American baseball player
  - Frank Burke (hurler) (born 1952), Irish hurler
  - Frank Burke (dual player) (1895–1987), Irish hurler and Gaelic footballer
  - Frankie Burke (1915–1983), American actor
- Fred Burke (1893–1940), American armed robber and contract killer

=== G ===
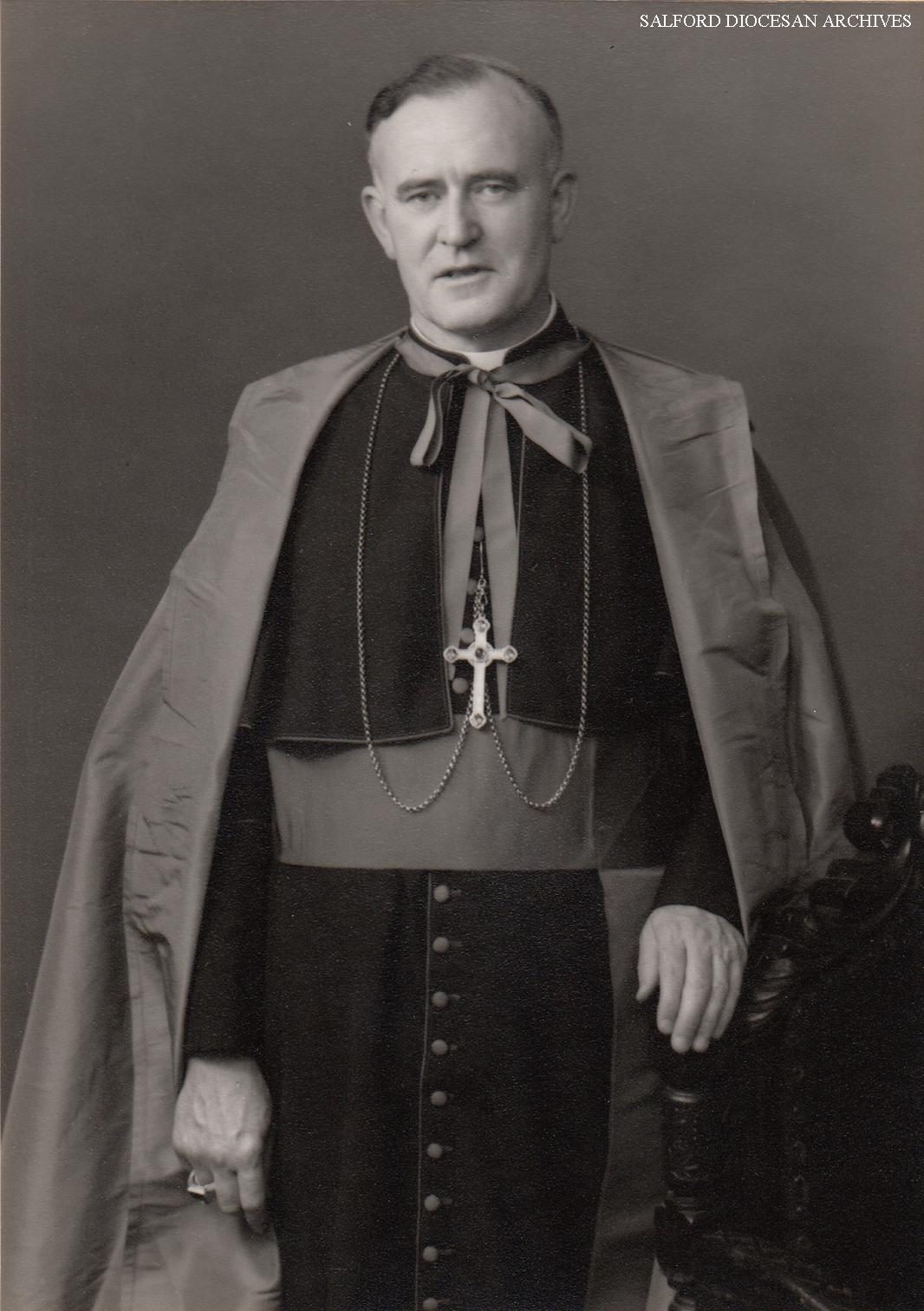
Geoffrey Burke

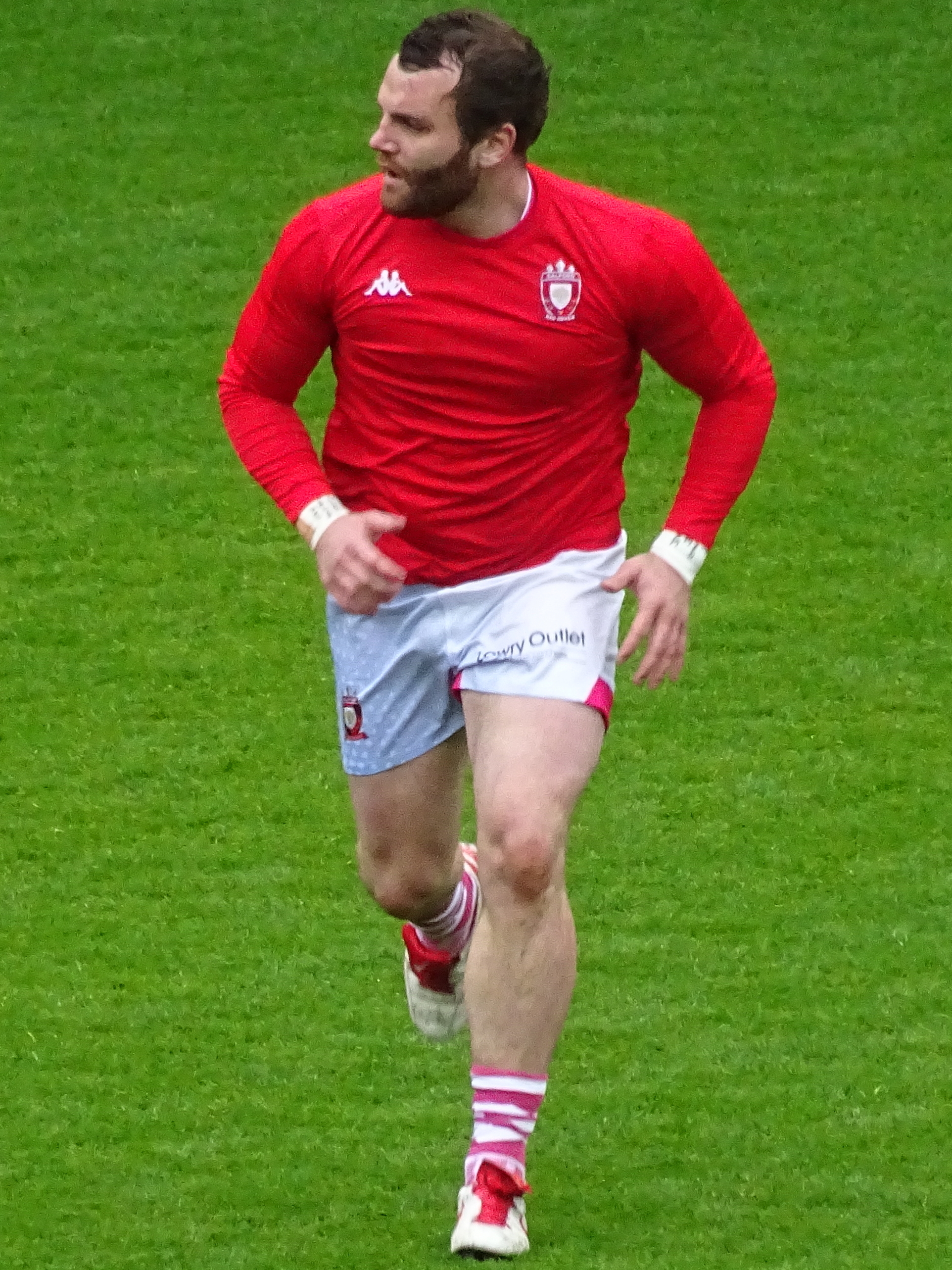
Greg Burke

- Geoffrey Burke (1913–1999), English Roman Catholic bishop
- George Burke (disambiguation), multiple people, including:
  - George Burke (cricketer) (1847–1920), English cricketer
  - George Thew Burke (1776–1854), Canadian soldier, merchant and politician
  - George J. Burke (1886–1950), judge during the Nuremberg Trials
- Georgia Burke (1878–1984), actress
- Gerald Burke (1930–1994), Australian rules footballer
- Gerry Burke, Irish hurler
- Gillian Burke (born 1974/1975), British natural history television programme producer and voiceover artist
- Glenn Burke (1952–1995), American baseball player
- Gordon Burke (born 1941), American politician
- Graham Burke (born 1993), Irish footballer
- Greg Burke (disambiguation), multiple people, including:
  - Greg Burke (athletic director) (born 1956), director of athletics for Northwestern State University
  - Greg Burke (baseball) (born 1982), Major League Baseball relief pitcher who played for San Diego and the New York Mets
  - Greg Burke (journalist) (born 1959), American former TV news correspondent and adviser to Pope Francis
  - Greg Burke (rugby league) (born 1993), rugby league player
- Gregory Burke (born 1968), Scottish playwright
- Gregory Burke (curator) (born 1957), Canadian museum director, writer and curator

=== H ===
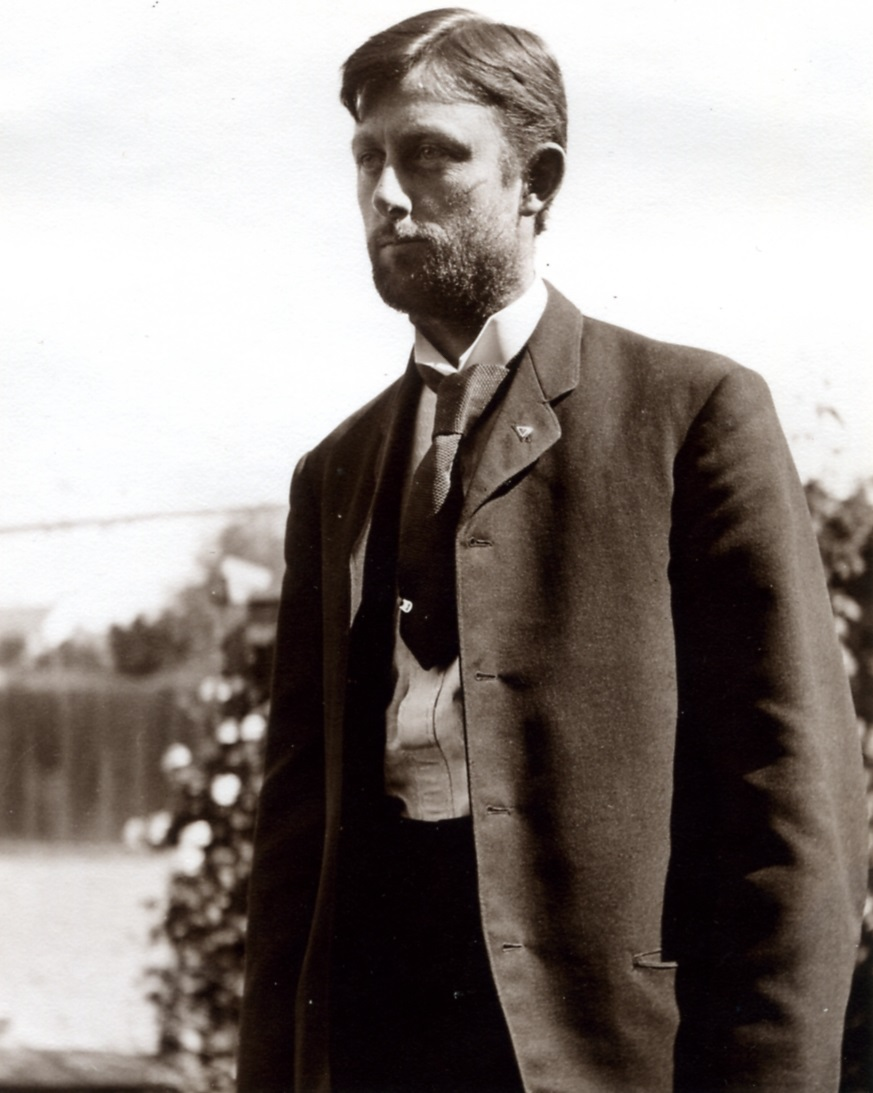
Harry E. Burke

- Hannah Burke (born 1988), English professional golfer
- Harold P. Burke (1895–1981), American judge
- Harry E. Burke (1878–1963), American forest entomologist
- Heather Burke (born 1966), Australian historical archaeologist
- Helen Burke, Countess Clanricarde, or Helen MacCarty or Helen FitzGerald (c.1641–1722), Irish peeress
- Henry Burke (disambiguation), multiple people, including:
  - Henry Farnham Burke (1859–1930), British genealogist, Garter Principal King of Arms
  - Henry Lardner-Burke (1916–1970), South African flying ace
- Honora Burke (1674–1698), an Irish aristocrat married to Patrick Sarsfield and the Duke of Berwick

=== I ===
- Ian Burke Irish Gaelic football player
- Ingrid Burke or "Indy" Burke, American botanist and academic
- Irwin Burke (born 1916, date of death unknown), Barbadian cricketer

=== J ===
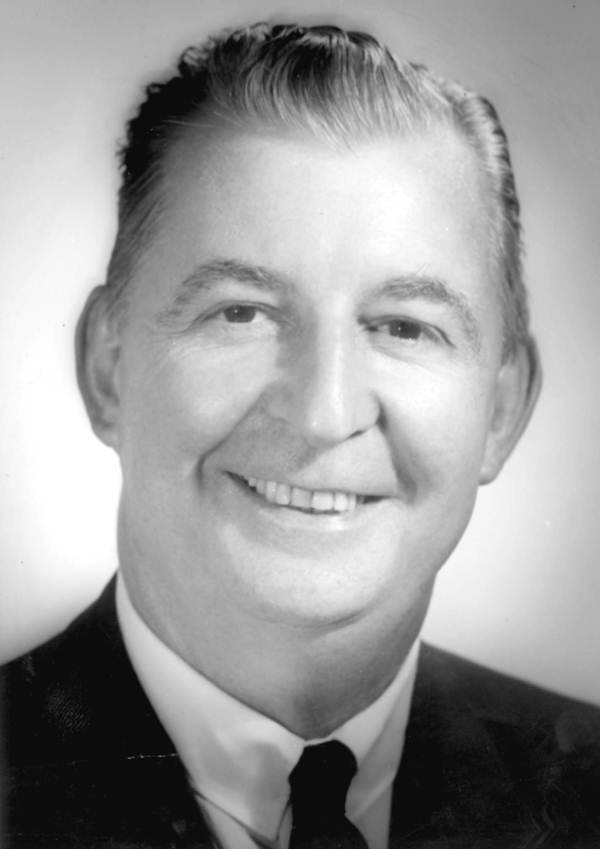
J. Herbert Burke

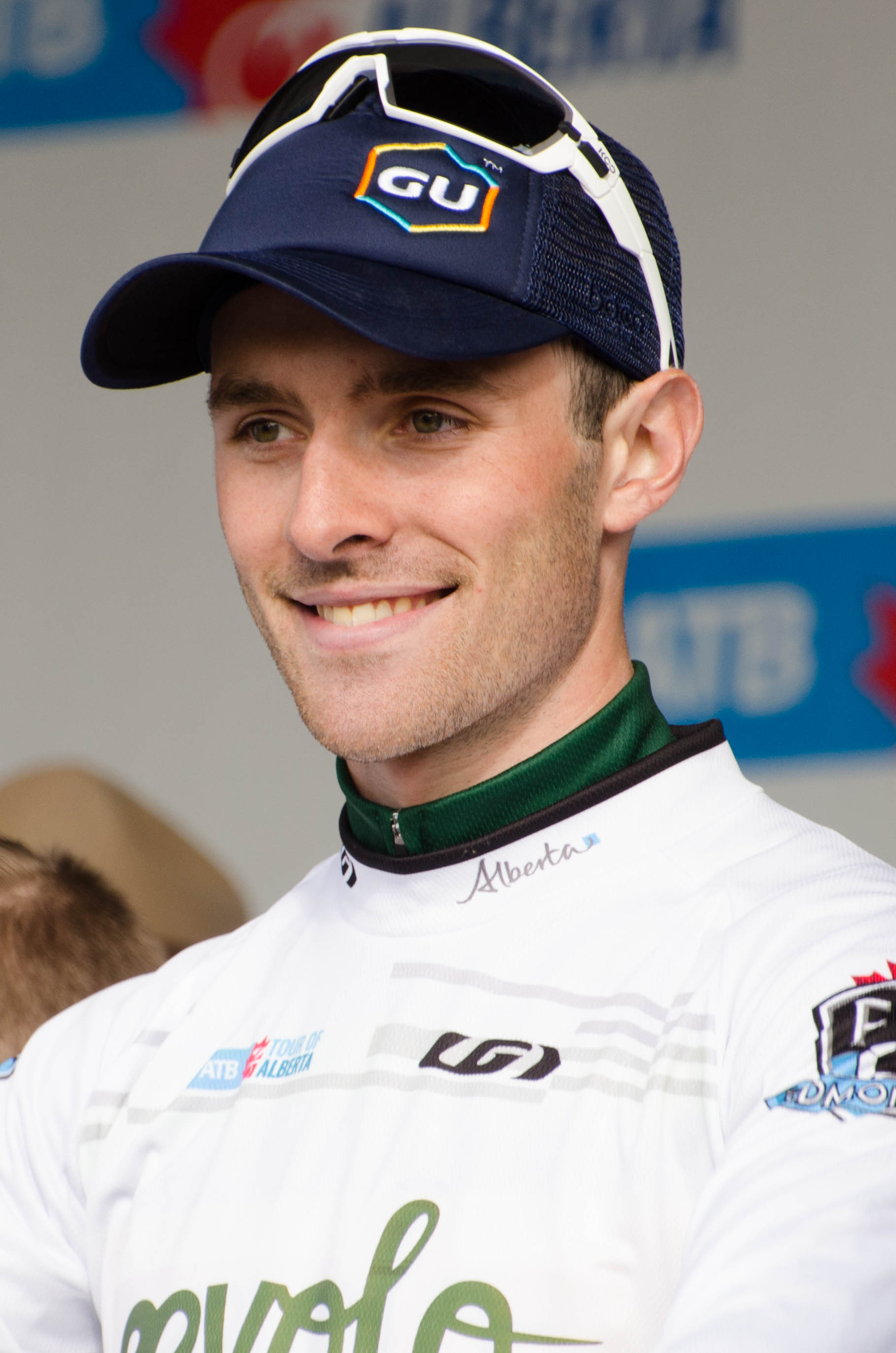
Jack Burke

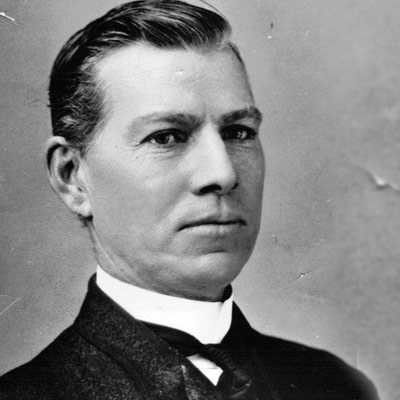
James Edmund Burke

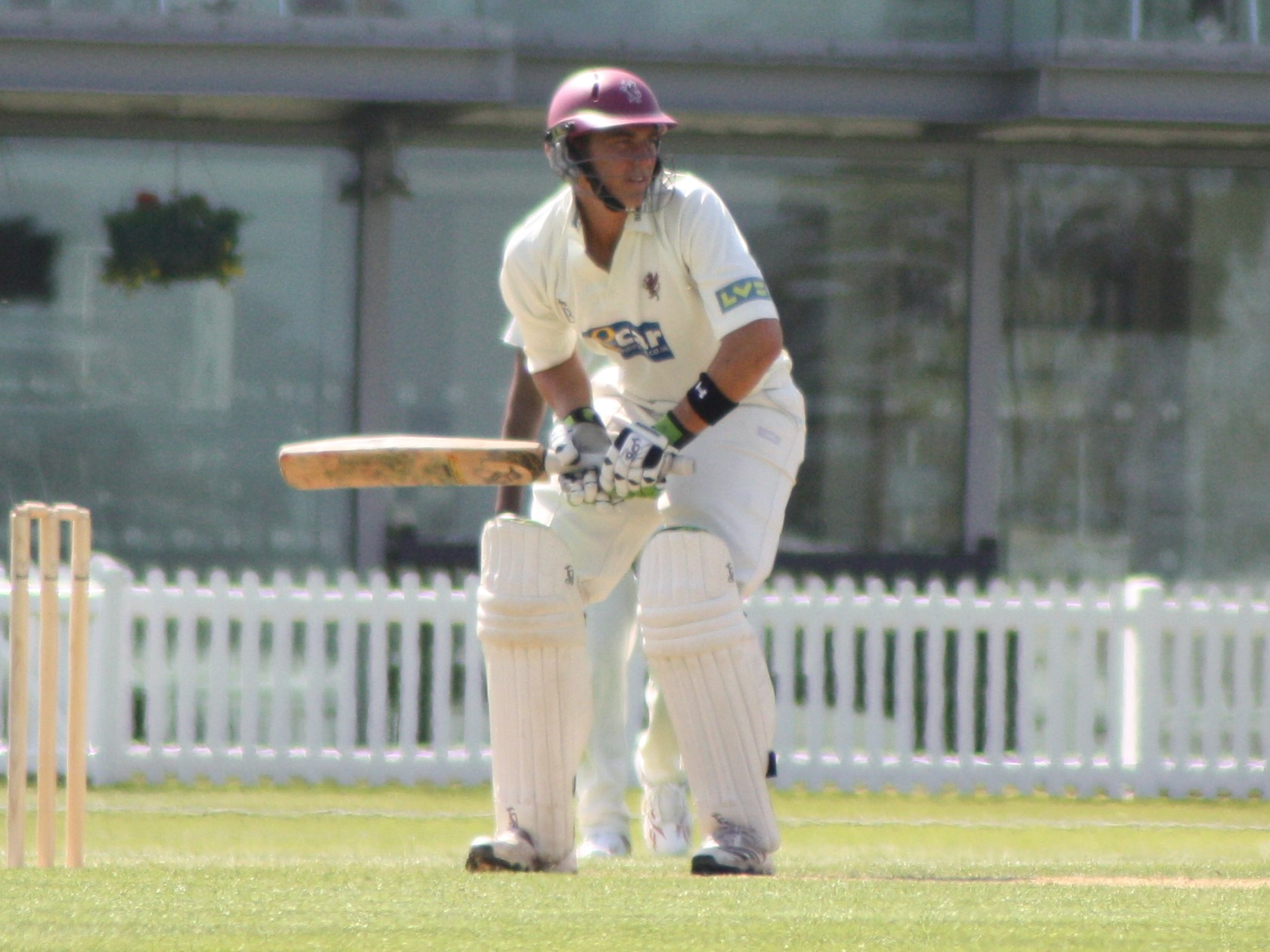
James Burke

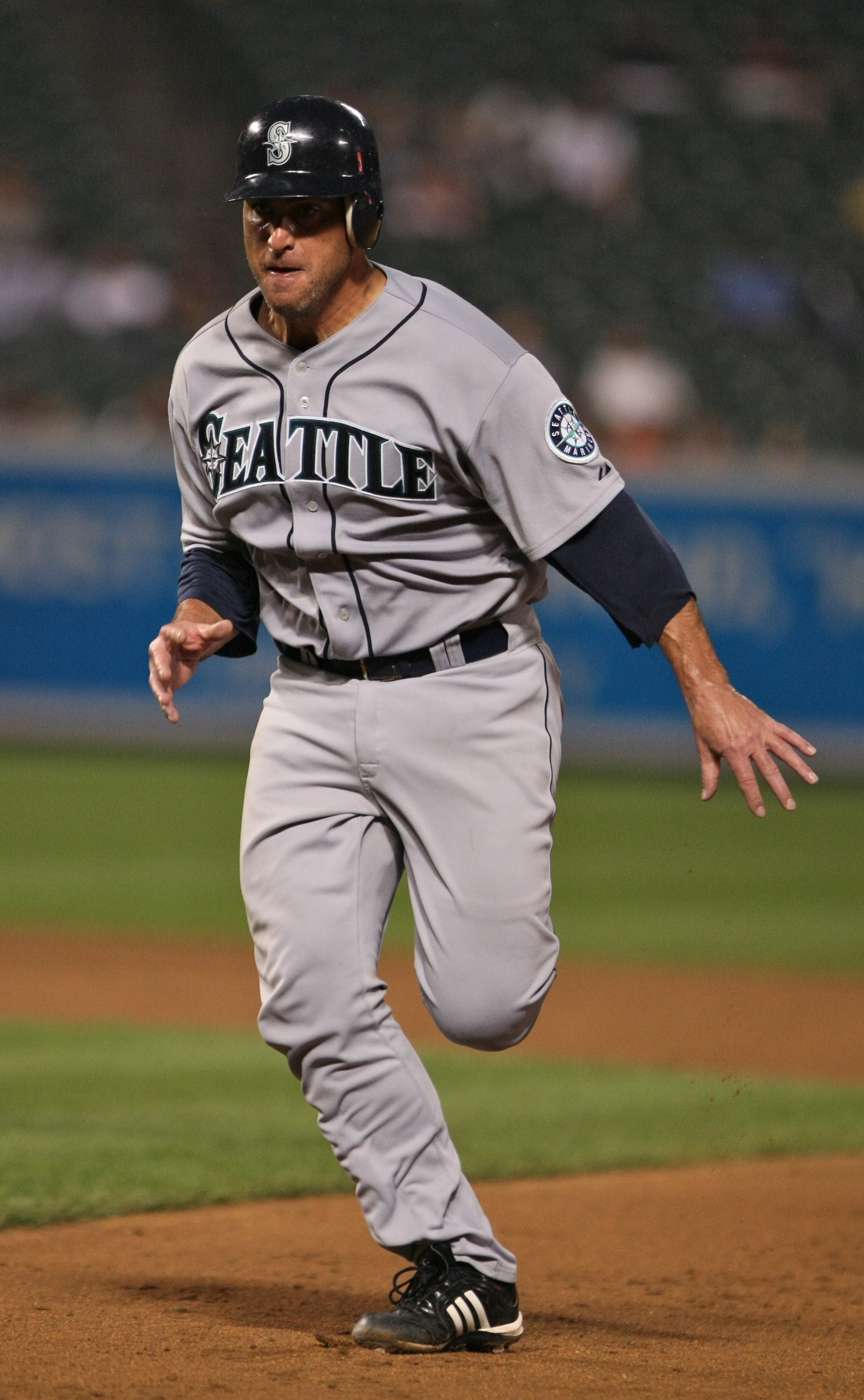
Jamie Burke

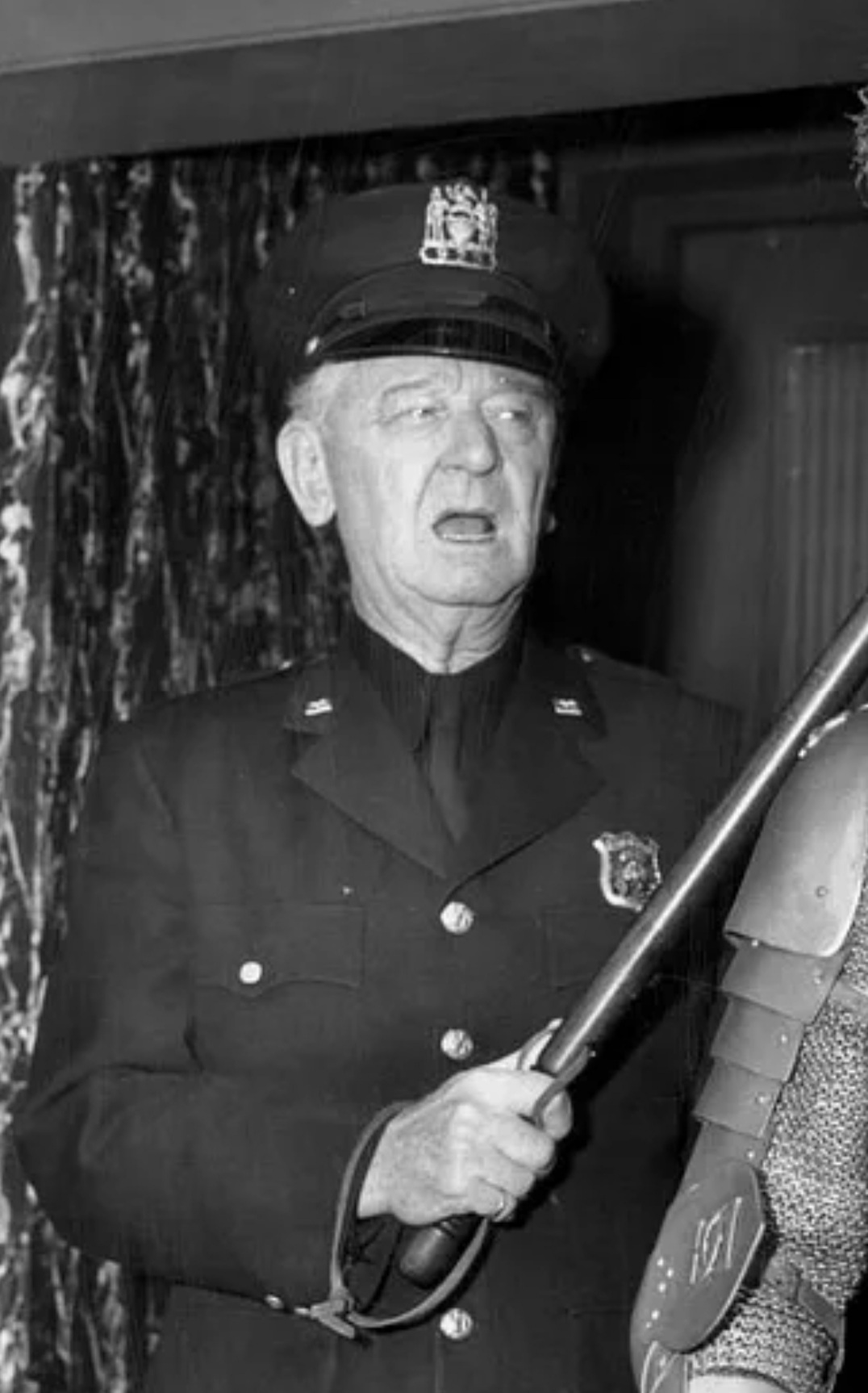
James Burke

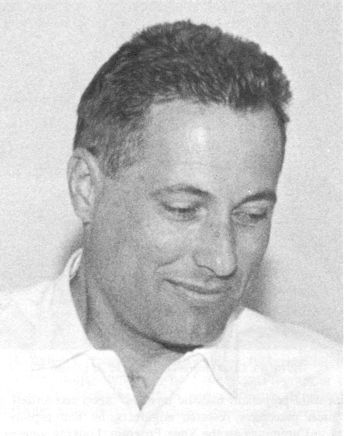
James Burke

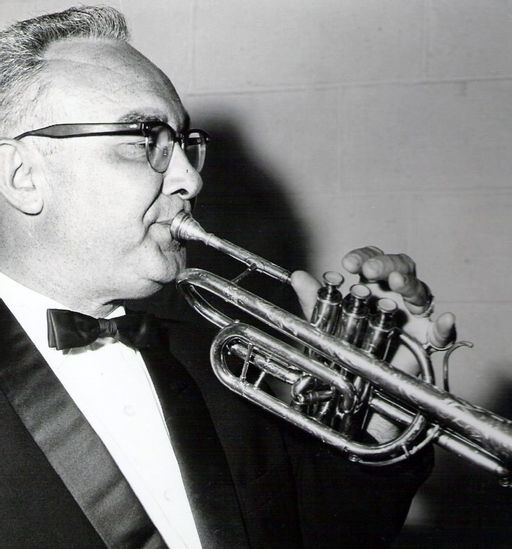
James F. Burke

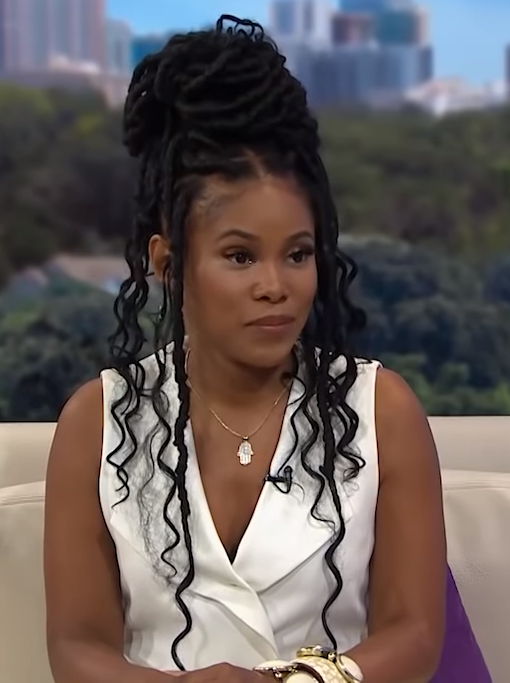
Jasmine Burke

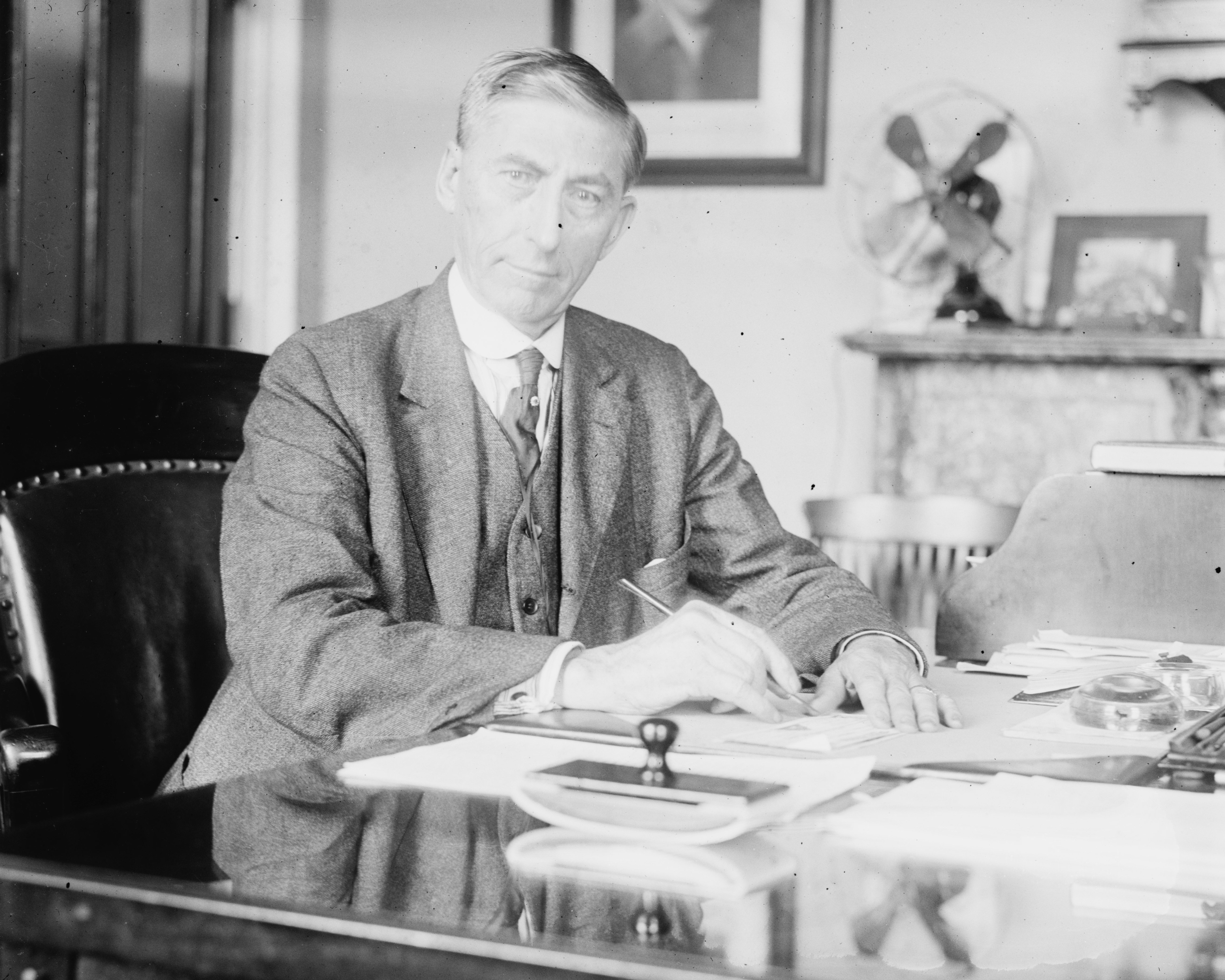
John Burke

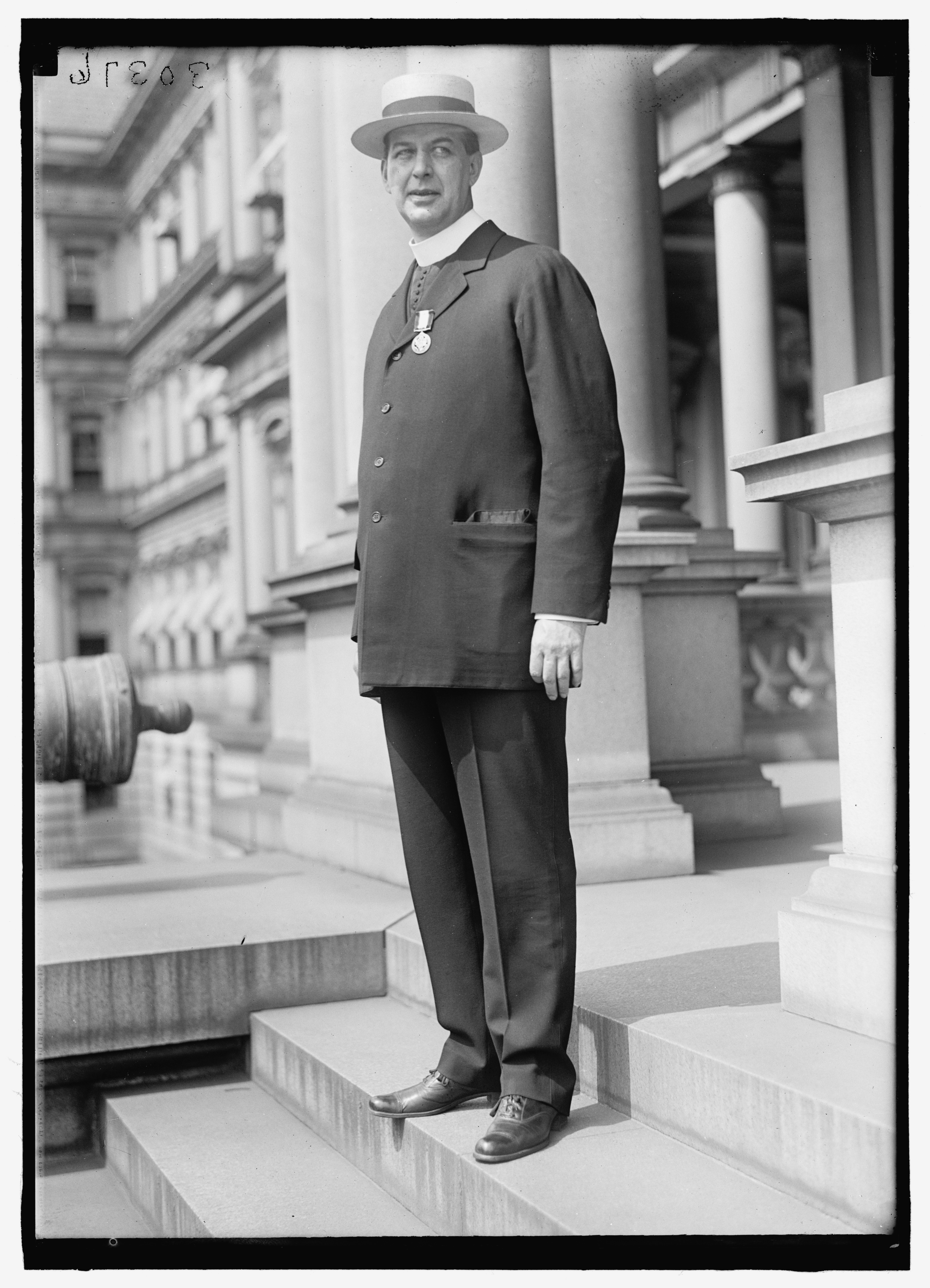
John J. Burke

- J. C. Burke (born 1965), Australian author
- J. Herbert Burke (1913–1993), American Republican politician
- J. Martin Burke, American legal scholar and Professor of Law
- Jack Burke (disambiguation), multiple people, including:
  - Jack Burke Jr. (1923–2024), American golfer
  - Jack Burke Sr. (1888–1943), American golfer
  - Jack Burke (boxer) (1875–1942), American boxer known for fighting the longest boxing match in history
  - Jack Burke (footballer) (1918–2004), Australian footballer, who played for Hawthorn
  - Jack Burke (cyclist) (born 1995), Canadian cyclist
- Jackson Burke (1908–1975), American type and book designer
- Jacqui Burke (born 1953), Australian politician,
- James Burke (disambiguation), multiple people, including:
  - James F. Burke (politician) (1867–1932), United States Representative from Pennsylvania
  - James Burke (Australian politician) (born 1971), member of the Northern Territory Legislative Assembly
  - James Burke (Cork politician) (died 1936), Irish Cumann na nGaedhael politician and barrister
  - James Burke (Roscommon politician) (died 1964), Irish Fine Gael politician and farmer
  - James A. Burke (New York politician) (1890–1965), New York City politician and Queens Borough President
  - James A. Burke (Massachusetts politician) (1910–1983), U.S. Congressman from Massachusetts
  - James Edmund Burke (1849–1943), American politician and Mayor of Burlington, Vermont
  - James Burke (boxer) (1809–1845), English boxer
  - James Burke (cricketer) (born 1991), English cricketer
  - James Burke (19th-century footballer), 19th-century football player
  - James Burke (Dublin hurler), inter county senior hurler with Dublin
  - James Burke (Kildare hurler) (born 1999), Irish hurler
  - James Burke (wrestler) (1936–2006), American Olympic wrestler
  - Jamie Burke (born 1971), baseball player
  - Jamie Burke (rugby union) (born 1980), American rugby union player
  - James Burke (baseball), American baseball player for the 1884 Boston Reds
  - Jimmy Burke (baseball) (1874–1942), American baseball player
  - James Burke (bishop) (1926–1994), American-born Catholic bishop in Peru
  - James Burke (science historian) (born 1936), British broadcaster, author, and television producer
  - James E. Burke (1925–2012), CEO of Johnson & Johnson
  - James Cobb Burke (1915–1964), American photographer and photojournalist
  - James Burke (actor) (1886–1968), appeared in The Maltese Falcon and numerous other films
  - James Lee Burke (born 1936), American author
  - James Burke (gangster) (1931–1996), Irish-American gangster
  - E. James Burke (born 1949), justice of the Wyoming Supreme Court
  - James Burke (space engineer) (1925–2023), American lunar settlement and exploration expert, known for the Ranger program
  - James F. Burke (musician) (1923–1981), American cornet soloist
- James F. Burke (disambiguation), multiple people, including:
  - James F. Burke (politician) (1867–1932), United States Representative from Pennsylvania
  - James F. Burke (musician) (1923–1981), American cornet soloist
- Jamie Burke (born 1971), Major League Baseball catcher for the Seattle Mariners
- Jan Burke (born 1953), American author of novels and short stories
- Janine Burke, Australian author, art historian, biographer and novelist
- Jarrad Burke (born 1983) is an Australian cricketer
- Jason Burke (born 1970), British author and journalist
- Jasmine Burke (born 1983), American actress
- Jean Dadario Burke, American television soap opera producer and director
- Jenni Burke (born 1971/2), Australian swimmer
- Jennifer Burke or Jennifer Lo or Jennifer Mather, Canadian television
- Jerry Burke (1911–1965), American musician
- Jim Burke (disambiguation), multiple people, including:
  - Jim Burke (author) (born 1961), American author
  - Jim Burke (cricketer) (1930–1979), Australian cricketer
  - Jim Burke (illustrator) (born 1973), American illustrator
  - Jim Burke (c. 1956–1994), the real name of the prolific letter column contributor T. M. Maple
  - Mr. B The Gentleman Rhymer (Jim Burke), British parodist and rapper
  - Jim Burke (film producer) or Jim Burke Jr, American film producer who frequently collaborates with Alexander Payne and Jim Taylor
- Jimmy Burke (disambiguation), multiple people, including:
  - James Burke (gangster) (1931–1996), Irish-American gangster
  - Jimmy Burke (baseball) (1874–1942), American baseball player
- Joan Burke or Joan Crowley (1928–2016), Irish Fine Gael politician, farmer and nurse
- John Burke (disambiguation), multiple people, including:
  - John mac Richard Mór Burke, 10th Clanricarde or Mac William Uachtar (d. 1536), Irish chieftain and noble
  - John Burke, 9th Earl of Clanricarde (1642–1722), Irish soldier and peer
  - John Smith de Burgh, 11th Earl of Clanricarde or John Smith Burke (1720–1782), Irish peer
  - John Burke, Baron Leitrim or John "na Seamer" Burke or Seán mac an Iarla a Búrc, 1st Baron Leitrim (d. 1583), Irish noble
  - Sir John Burke, 2nd Baronet (1782–1847), Irish soldier and MP for Galway County
  - John Burke (North Dakota politician) (1859–1937), 10th Governor of North Dakota and Treasurer of the United States
  - John H. Burke (politician) (1894–1951), American lawyer, real estate broker, and politician
  - John Francis Burke (1923–2006), Canadian politician
  - John Burke (mayor) (born 1946), mayor of Porirua City New Zealand, 1983–1998
  - John R. Burke (1924–1993), U.S. ambassador to Guyana
  - John P. Burke (born 1954), American politician in Massachusetts
  - John Burke (Rhode Island politician) (born 1960), member of the Rhode Island Senate
  - John Burke (spy) (1830–1871), Confederate spy in the American Civil War
  - John Burke (colonel) (1838–1914), officer in the Union Army during the American Civil War
  - John Luddy Burke (1909–2003), United States Navy officer and business executive
  - John Oge Burke (d. 1601), Irish gentleman and soldier
  - Johnny Burke (lyricist) (1908–1964), American songwriter
  - John Burke (composer) (1951–2020), Canadian composer
  - Johnny Burke (Newfoundland songwriter) (1851–1930), Newfoundland songwriter
  - Johnny Burke (Canadian singer) (died 2017), Canadian country singer
  - John Burke (American pianist) (born 1988), American composer & pianist
  - John Burke (1900s pitcher) (1877–1950), U.S. baseball player for the New York Giants
  - John Burke (1990s pitcher) (born 1970), U.S. baseball player for the Colorado Rockies and the University of Florida
  - John Burke (American football) (born 1971), played for the New England Patriots, New York Jets and San Diego Chargers
  - John Burke (footballer, fl. 1927–35), Irish footballer from Tipperary
  - Johnny Burke (footballer) (1911–1987), Irish footballer
  - John Burke (footballer, born 1956), Irish footballer from Dublin
  - John Burke (footballer, born 1962), Scottish footballer for Exeter City and Chester City
  - John Burke (rugby league, born 1948) (1948–2013), rugby league footballer of the 1970s for Leeds, Keighley
  - John Burke (rugby league, born 1957), rugby league footballer of the 1970s for Wigan, and Workington Town
  - Jack Burke Sr. (John Burke, 1888–1943), American golfer
  - Jack Burke Jr. (John Burke, born 1923), American golfer
  - John MacSeonin Burke (died 1450), Archbishop of Tuam, 1441–1450
  - John J. Burke (1875–1936), Paulist priest and editor of the Catholic World
  - John Burke (genealogist) (1786–1848), Irish genealogist, founder of Burke's Peerage
  - Sir John Bernard Burke (1814–1892), British genealogist
  - John F. Burke (1922–2011), American medical researcher and co-inventor of synthetic skin in 1981
  - Arizona John Burke (1842–1917), American publicist, press agent and author
  - John Burke (author) (1922–2011), English writer of novels and short stories
  - John Burke (artist) (1946–2006), Irish artist
  - John Burke (photographer) (c.1843–1900), 19th century British photographer
  - John M. Burke (born 2001), American chess player
- Joseph Burke (disambiguation), multiple people, including:
  - Joe Burke (composer) (1884–1950), American actor, composer and pianist
  - Joe Burke (accordionist) (1939–2021), Irish accordion player
  - Joe Burke (baseball executive) (1923–1992), baseball executive
  - Joe Burke (baseball executive) (1923–1992), American Major League Baseball executive
  - Joseph Burke (cricketer) (1923–2005), Irish cricketer
  - Joe Burke (infielder) (1867–1940), 19th-century baseball player
  - Joe Burke (outfielder), baseball right fielder in the Negro leagues
  - Joe Burke (New Zealand footballer), New Zealand international football (soccer) player
  - Joe Burke (rugby league) (born 1990), rugby league footballer for Wales, and South Wales Scorpions
  - Joe Burke (American football) (born 1961), American football player
  - Joseph Burke (botanist) (1812–1873), English collector of plants and animals
  - Joseph Burke (politician) (1853– after 1888), land surveyor and political figure in Manitoba
  - Joseph A. Burke (1886–1962), bishop of Buffalo
  - Joseph Burke (judge) (1888–1990), Illinois judge
  - Joseph C. Burke (1932–2018), American educator
  - Sir Joseph Burke, 11th Baronet of the Burke baronets
  - Sonny Burke (Joseph Francis Burke, 1914–1980), American musician
- Joy Burke or Bao Hsi-le (born 1990), Taiwanese-American basketball player
- Junior Burke, American fiction writer, songwriter and educator

=== K ===
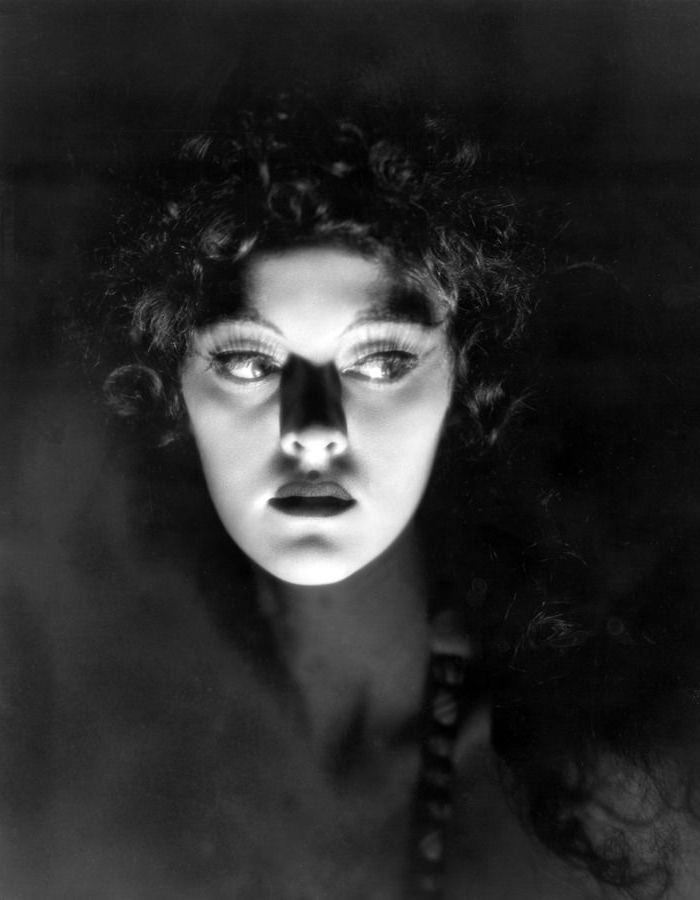
Kathleen Burke

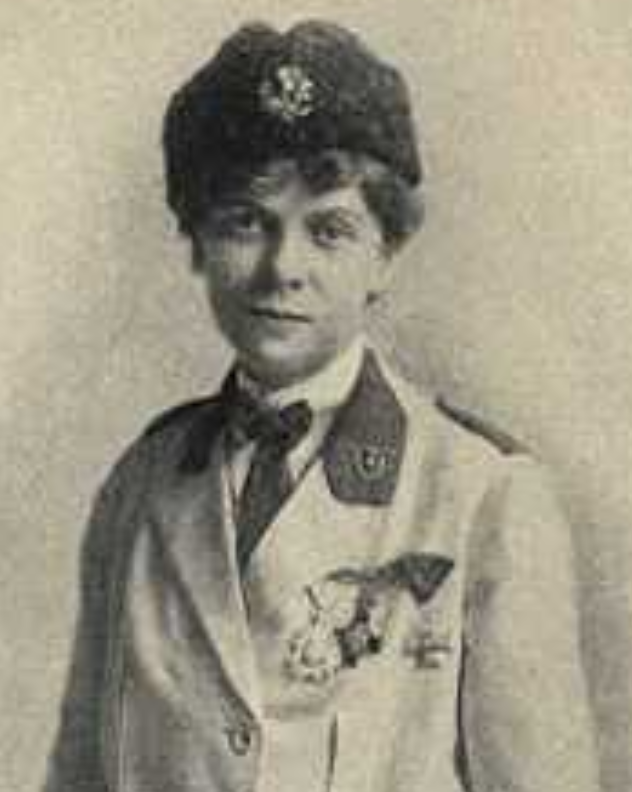
Kathleen Burke Hale

- Kamar Burke (born 1986), Canadian professional basketball player
- Kareem Burke (born 1974), American entrepreneur and record executive
- Karen Burke (born 1971), English footballer
- Karen Danczuk or Karen Burke, British politician and campaigner
- Katherine Delmar Burke (1867–1929), American educator
- Kathi Burke, Irish artist
- Kathleen Burke (1913–1980), American actress and model
- Kathleen Burke Hale or Kathleen Burke Peabody McLean Hale (1887–1958), British-American philanthropist and war worker
- Kathy Burke (born 1964), English actress, comic and theatre director
- Kelly Burke (born 1944), American model
- Kelly M. Burke, American Democratic politician and member of the Illinois House of Representatives
- Keni Burke or Kenneth M. Burke (born 1953), American singer, songwriter, record producer, and multi-instrumentalist
- Kenn Burke, Scottish ballet dancer
- Kennedy Burke (born 1997), American professional basketball player
- Kenneth Burke (1897–1993), American literary theorist and philosopher
- Kerry Burke or Sir Thomas Kerry Burke (born 1942), New Zealand politician
- Kerry Burke (rugby league), Australian former rugby league footballer
- Kerry Burke (reporter) American city reporter for the New York Daily News
- Kevin Burke (disambiguation), multiple people, including:
  - Kevin Burke (musician) (born 1950), Irish fiddler
  - Kevin Burke (CEO), chairman, president, and CEO of Consolidated Edison
  - Kevin Burke (judge) (born 1950), district judge in Hennepin County, Minnesota
  - Kevin Burke (quarterback) (born 1993), college football quarterback, two-time Gagliardi Trophy winner
  - Kevin Burke (American football coach), American football coach and wide receiver
  - Kevin Burke (hurler) (born 2000), Irish hurler
  - Kevin C. A. Burke (1929–2018), British-American geologist, professor of geology and tectonics at the University of Houston, USA
  - Kevin M. Burke (born 1946), American attorney and politician in the Massachusetts House of Representatives

=== L ===
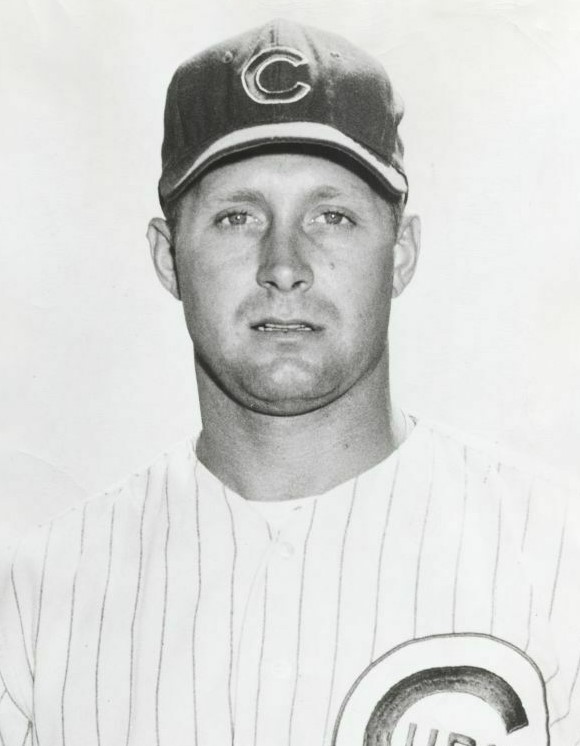
Leo Burke

Leon Burke III

- Lena Burke or Lena Pérez or Lena (born 1978), Cuban singer-songwriter
- Lenka Pichlíková-Burke (born 1954), American actress
- Leo Burke (disambiguation), multiple people, including:
  - Leo Burke (born 1948), Canadian retired professional wrestler
  - Leo Burke (baseball) (born 1934), retired American utility player in Major League Baseball
  - Leo Burke (footballer) (1891–1957), Australian rules footballer
- Leon Burke III, American musician
- Leonie Burke or Leonie Hemingway (born 1949), Australian politician
- Les Burke or Leslie Kingston Burke or "Buck" (1902–1975), American baseball player
- Liam Burke (1928–2005), Irish Fine Gael politician
- Liam Burke (hurler), (born 1972), Irish hurler
- Liles C. Burke (born 1969), American judge
- Lillian Burke (1879–1952), American artist, teacher, musician and occupational therapist
- Lillie Burke (d. 1949), American founder of the first African-American sorority
- Lloyd Burke (disambiguation), multiple people, including:
  - Lloyd L. Burke, (1924–1999), American Medal of Honor recipient
  - Lloyd Hudson Burke (1916–1988), American federal judge
- Louis H. Burke (1905–1986), American lawyer
- Louise Burke, Australian sports dietitian, academic and author
- Luke Burke (born 1998), English professional footballer
- Lynn Burke (born 1943), American swimmer

=== M ===
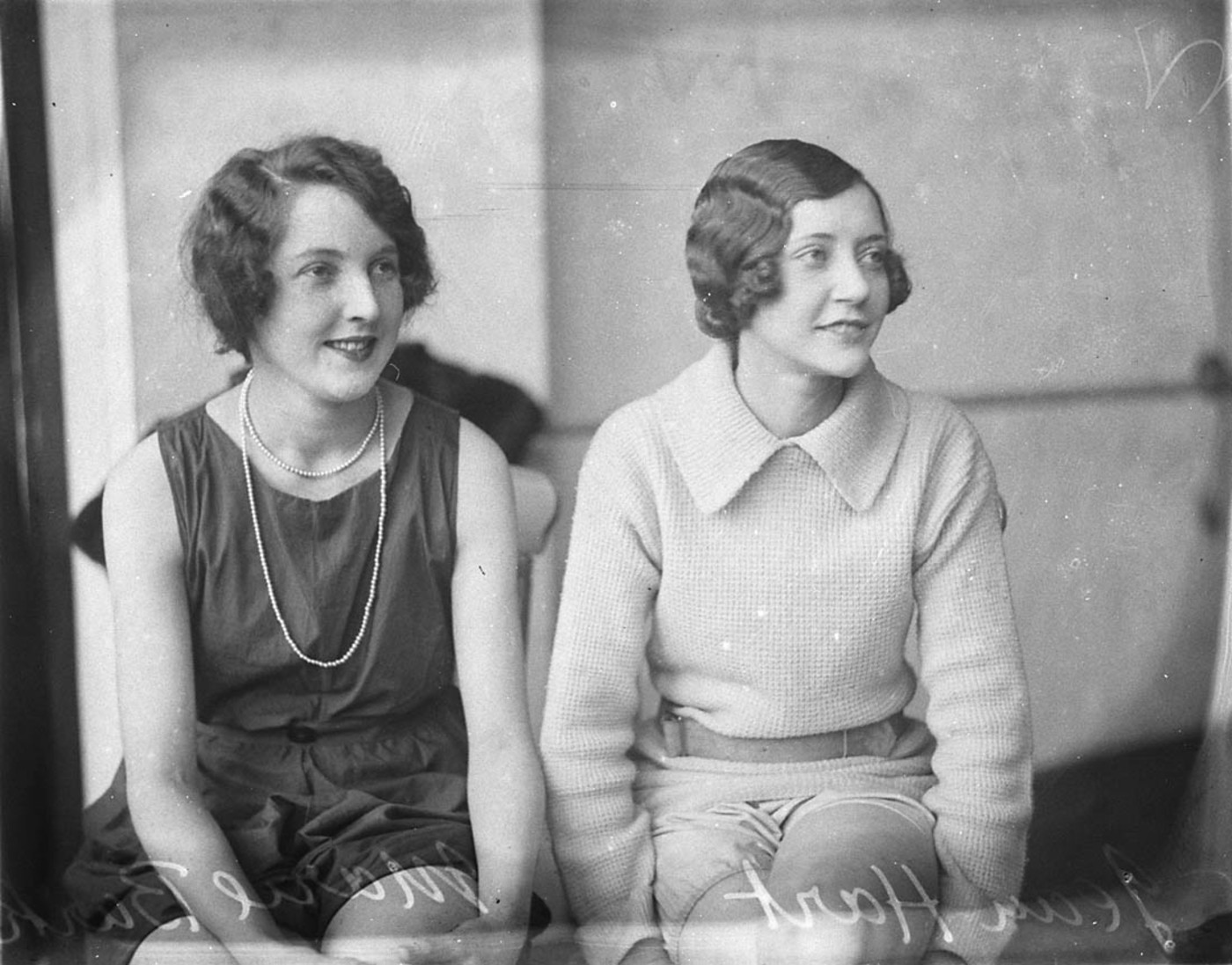
Marie Burke

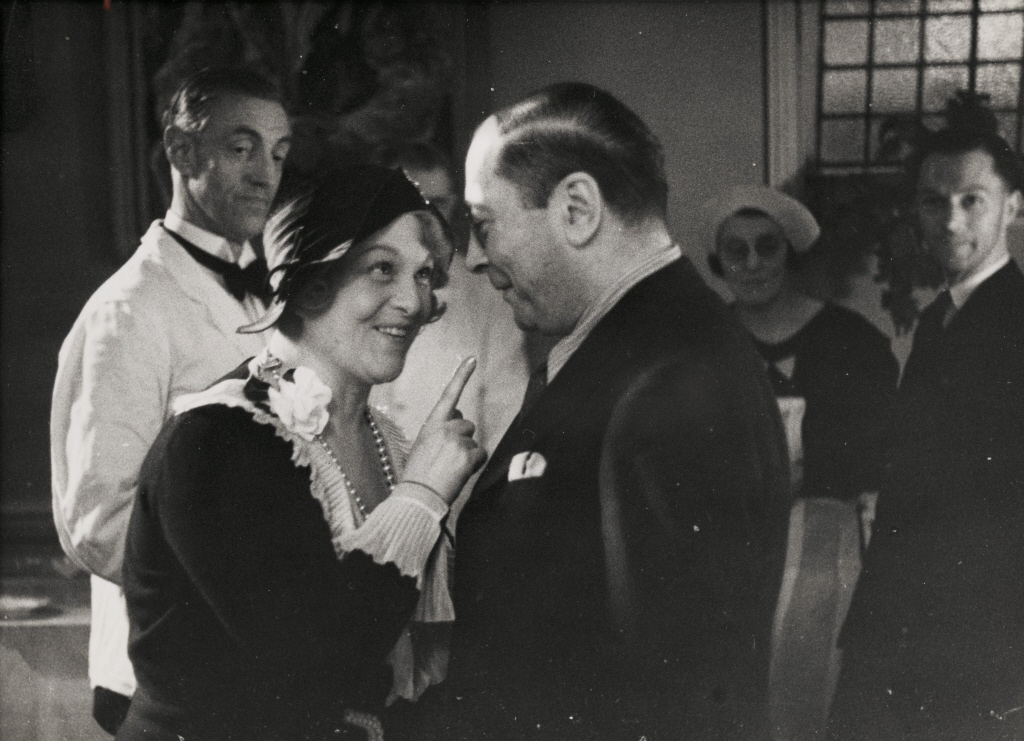
Margaret Burke Sheridan

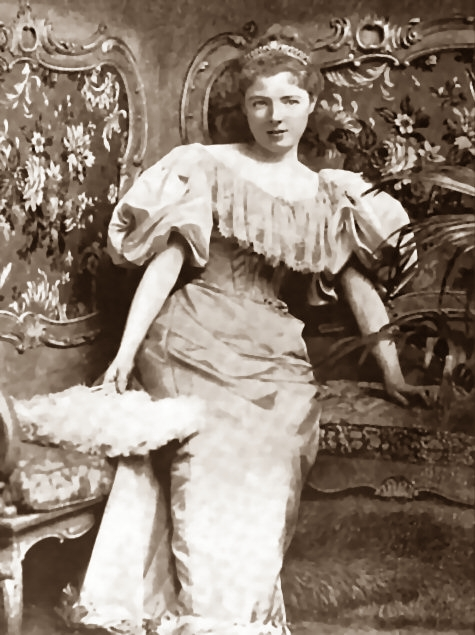
Maud Alice Burke Cunard

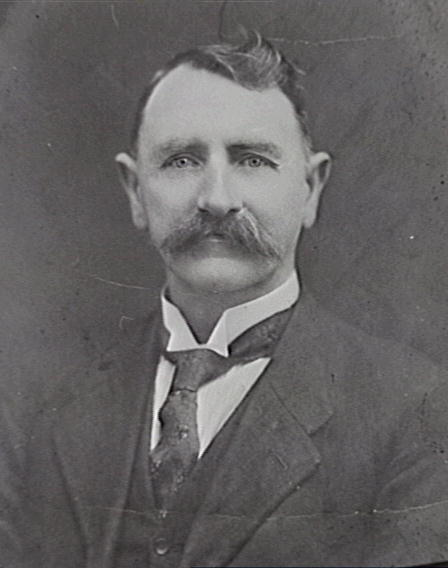
Michael Burke

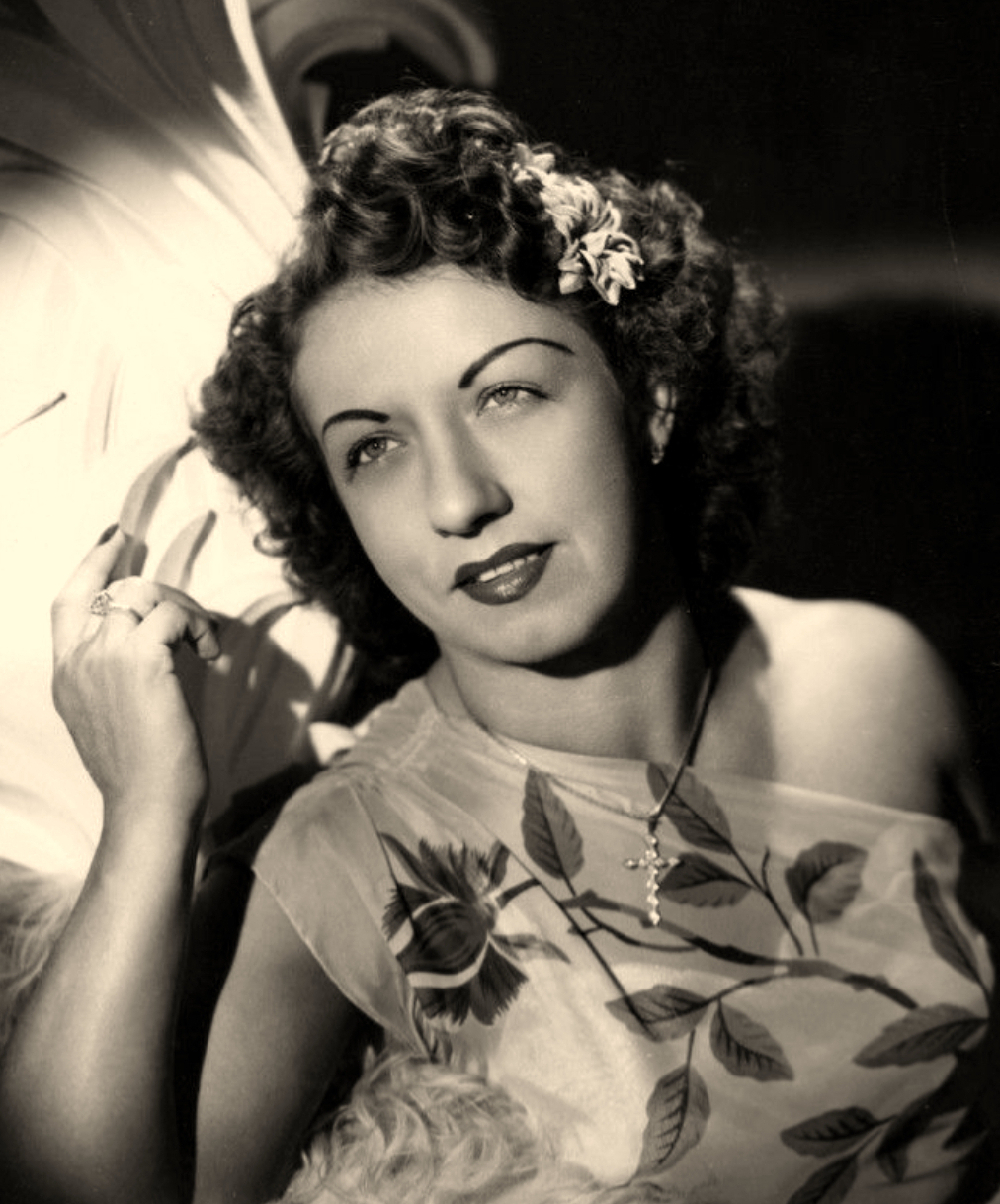
Mildred Burke

- Malena Burke (born 1958), Cuban singer
- Margaret Burke Sheridan (1889–1958), Irish opera singer
- Marie Burke or Marie Rosa Altfuldisch (later Holt) (1894–1988), English actress
- Mario Burke (born 1997), Barbadian sprinter
- Mark Burke (born 1969), English footballer
- Mark Andrew Burke (born 1969), Australian squash player
- Marshall Burke (born 1959), Scottish footballer
- Martyn Burke (born 1952), Canadian director, novelist and screenwriter
- Marvin Burke (1918–1994), American NASCAR driver
- Mary Burke (disambiguation), multiple people, including:
  - Mary Burke (born 1959) is an American businesswoman
  - Mary Burke (basketball) (born 1965), American women's college basketball coach
  - Marylouise Burke, American actress
  - Mary Burke Washington (1926–2014), American economist
  - Mary Griggs Burke (1916–2012), American art collector
  - Mary Burke (consort), (c.1560–c.1627), Irish noblewoman and consort of Brian O'Rourke
- Matt Burke (disambiguation), multiple people, including:
  - Matt Burke (rugby union) (born 1973), Australian rugby union player who represented the Wallabies from 1993 to 2004
  - Matt Burke (rugby) (born 1964), Australian rugby union and rugby league player who represented the Wallabies from 1984 to 1987
  - Matt Burke (American football) (born 1976), American football coach
  - Matthew Burke (born c. 1962), financial planner and Republican House of Representatives candidate
  - Matthew Burke (rugby union) (born 1997), Irish rugby union player
- Maud Cunard or Maud Alice Burke (1872– 1948), American-born, London-based society hostess
- Meghann Burke (born 1980), American professional soccer goalkeeper
- Melanie Burke, New Zealand duathlete and triathlete
- Michael Burke (disambiguation), multiple people, including:
  - Michael Burke (New South Wales colonial politician) (1843–1909), Australian politician from New South Wales
  - Michael E. Burke (1863–1918), American politician from Wisconsin
  - Michael Burke (Australian politician) (1865–1937), Australian politician from New South Wales
  - Mike Burke (shortstop) (1854–1889), American Major League Baseball player
  - Micky Burke (1904–1984), Scottish football forward
  - Mick Burke (mountaineer) (1941–1975), English mountaineer and climbing cameraman
  - Mick Burke (Gaelic footballer) (born 1941), Irish Gaelic footballer
  - Mike Burke (punter) (born 1950), American football punter
  - Mick Burke (rugby league) (born 1958), English rugby league footballer
  - Mike Burke (strongman) (born 1974), American professional strongman competitor
  - Michael Burke (soccer) (born 1977), American Major League Soccer player
  - Michael Burke (Gaelic footballer) (born 1985), Irish Gaelic football player
  - Michael Burke, 10th Earl of Clanricarde (1686–1726), Irish peer
  - Michael Burke (poet) (c. 1800–1881), Irish poet
  - E. Michael Burke (1916–1987), American naval officer, CIA operative, circus, television and sports executive
  - Michael Reilly Burke (born 1964), American actor
  - Mike Burke (journalist), American journalist and senior producer of Democracy Now!
  - Michael Burke (economist), Irish economist
- Michèle Burke or Michèle Burke-Winter (1949–2025), Irish-born Academy Award-winning make-up artist
- Michelle Burke or Michelle Gray (born 1970), American actress
- Mickey Burke (disambiguation), multiple people, including:
  - Mickey Burke (footballer) (died 1993), Irish football player
  - Mickey Burke (hurler) (1927–1994), Irish retired hurler
- Mildred Burke (1915–1989), American professional wrestler
- Miles Burke (1885–1928), American flyweight boxer
- Mollie Burke, American politician and member of the Vermont House of Representatives
- Molly Burke (born 1994), Canadian YouTuber and disability rights advocate
- Morgan J. Burke Jr. (1906–1967), American judge and attorney

=== N ===
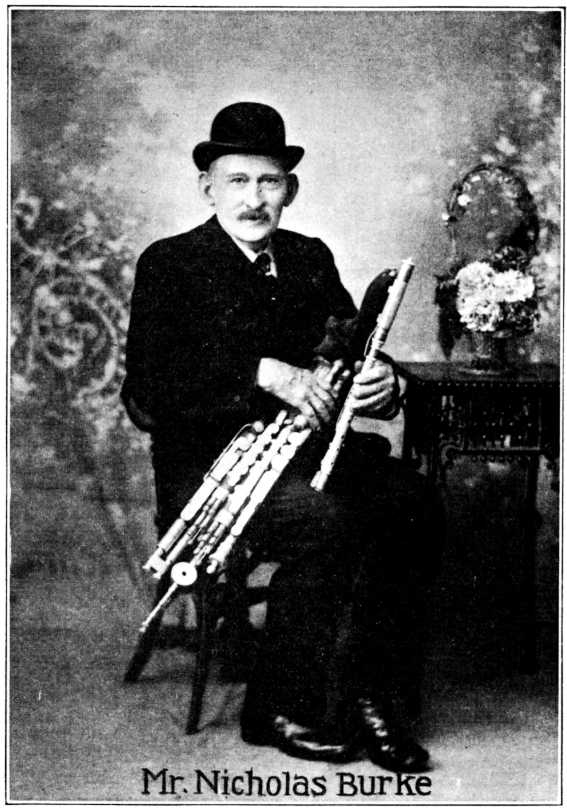
Nicholas Burke

- Nathan Burke (born 1970), Australian rules footballer
- Nathan Burke (musician), American bassist
- Nazim Burke (born 1956), Grenadaian politician from Carriacou
- Neil Burke, American musician and artist
- Niamh Reid Burke (born 1991) is an Irish association footballer
- Nicholas Burke (born 1837), Irish uilleann piper
- Nita Burke (born 1937), Australian basketball player
- Noel Burke (born 1962), Irish singer
- Norah Burke (1907–1976), British novelist, non- fiction and travel writer
- Northcote Burke (1927–1968), Canadian cleric and Dean of New Westminster from 1953 to 1968

=== O ===
- Oliver Burke (born 1997), Scottish professional footballer

=== P ===
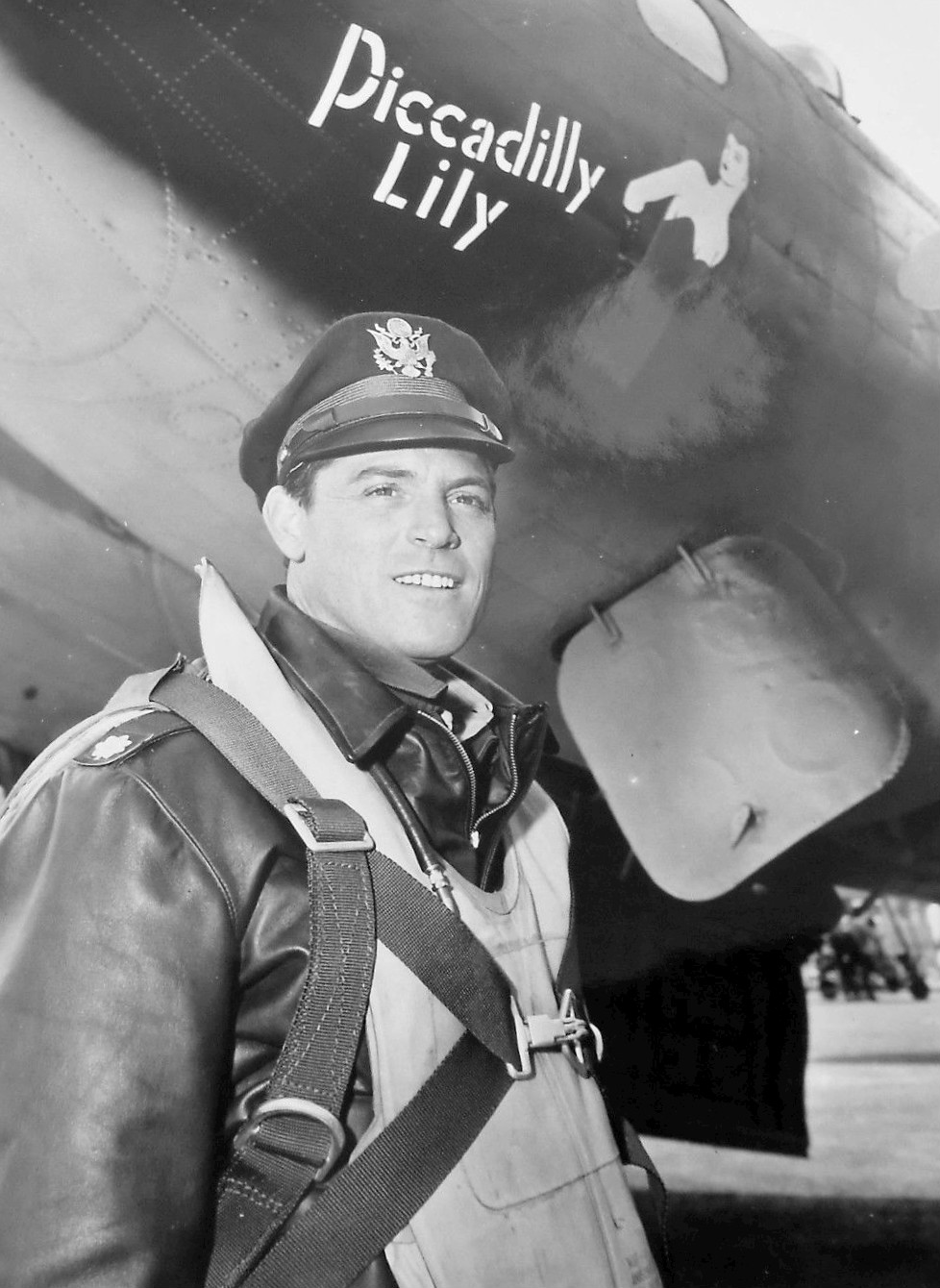
Paul Burke

- Paul Burke (disambiguation), multiple people, including:
  - Paul Burke (actor) (1926–2009), American actor in TV series Naked City (1960–63) and 12 O'Clock High
  - Paul Burke (boxer) (born 1966), English professional lightweight and light welterweight boxer
  - Paul Burke (rugby union) (born 1973), English born Ireland international
  - Paul Burke (rugby union) (born 1982), Scottish rugby union player
- Patricia Burke (1917–2003), English singer and actress
- Patrick Burke (disambiguation), multiple people, including:
  - Patrick B. Burke (born 1984), Democratic politician from New York
  - Patrick Burke (bishop) (1779–1843), bishop of Elphin from 1827 to 1843
  - Patrick Burke (Clare politician) (1879–1945), Irish politician from Clare
  - Patrick Burke (cricketer) (born 1919, date of death unknown), Trinidadian cricketer
  - Patrick Burke (Dublin politician) (1904–1985), Irish politician from Dublin
  - Patrick Burke (defensive back) (born 1968), Canadian football player
  - Patrick Burke (golfer) (born 1962), American golfer
  - Patrick F. Burke (1934–2011), American football player, businessman
  - Paddy Burke (born 1955), Irish Fine Gael party politician from County Mayo, Senator since 1993
  - Paddy Burke (Australian footballer) (1898–1953), Australian rules footballer
  - Pat Burke (baseball) (1901–1965), MLB player
  - Pat Burke (born 1973), Irish basketball player
  - Pat Burke (association footballer) (1889–1942), English footballer
  - Pat Burke (Gaelic footballer) (born 1983/4), Irish Gaelic footballer
  - Patrick E. Burke (1830–1864), lawyer, Missouri state legislator, and Civil War officer
- Peter Burke (disambiguation), multiple people, including:
  - Peter Burke (barrister) (1811–1881), English serjeant-at-law
  - Peter Burke (Gaelic footballer) (born 1976), played for Mayo
  - Peter Burke (historian) (born 1937), British historian and professor
  - Peter Burke (Irish footballer), Irish association footballer
  - Peter Burke (politician) (born 1982), Fine Gael TD for Longford–Westmeath
  - Peter Burke (rugby union) (1927–2017), New Zealand rugby union player and coach
  - Peter Burke (Australian footballer) (born 1964), Australian rules footballer
- Phil Burke (born 1982), Canadian film, television and stage actor
- Philip Burke (born 1956), American caricature artist and illustrator
- Phyllis Le Cappelaine Burke (1900–1969), Australian Catholic women's rights activist

=== R ===
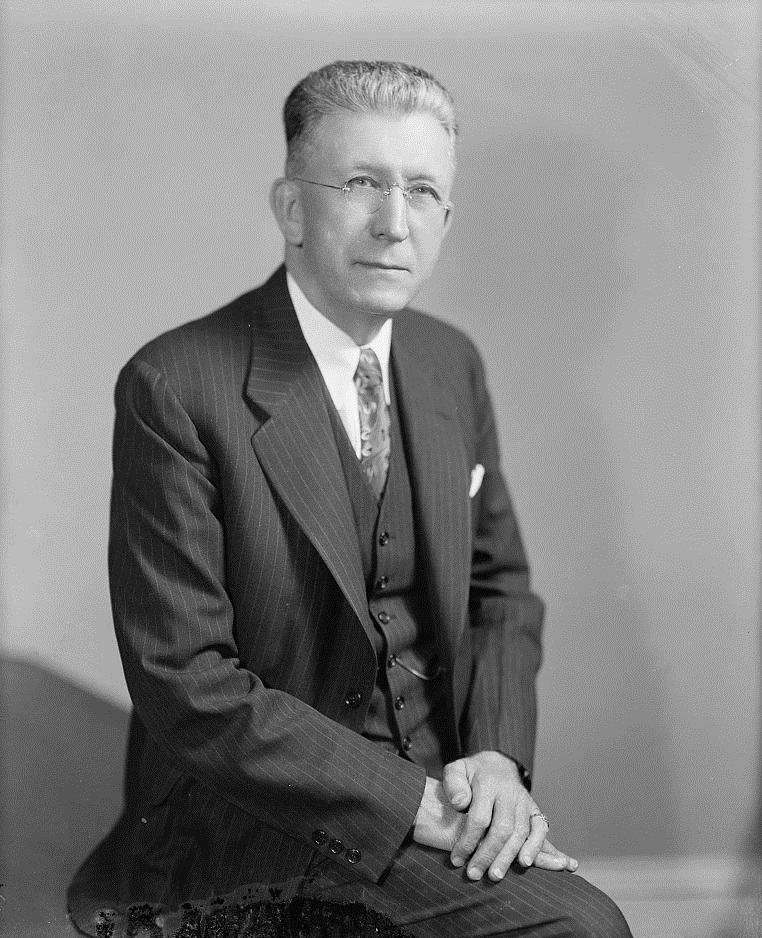
Raymond H. Burke

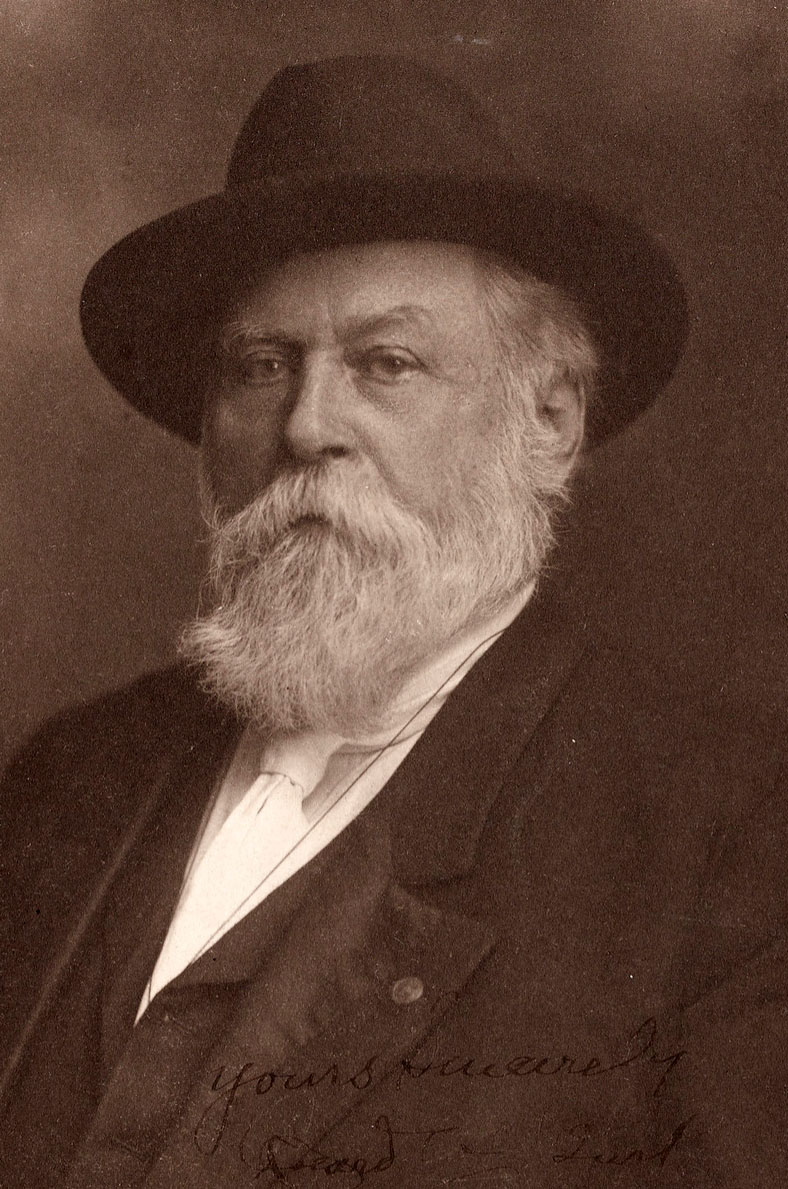
Ricard O'Sullivan Burke

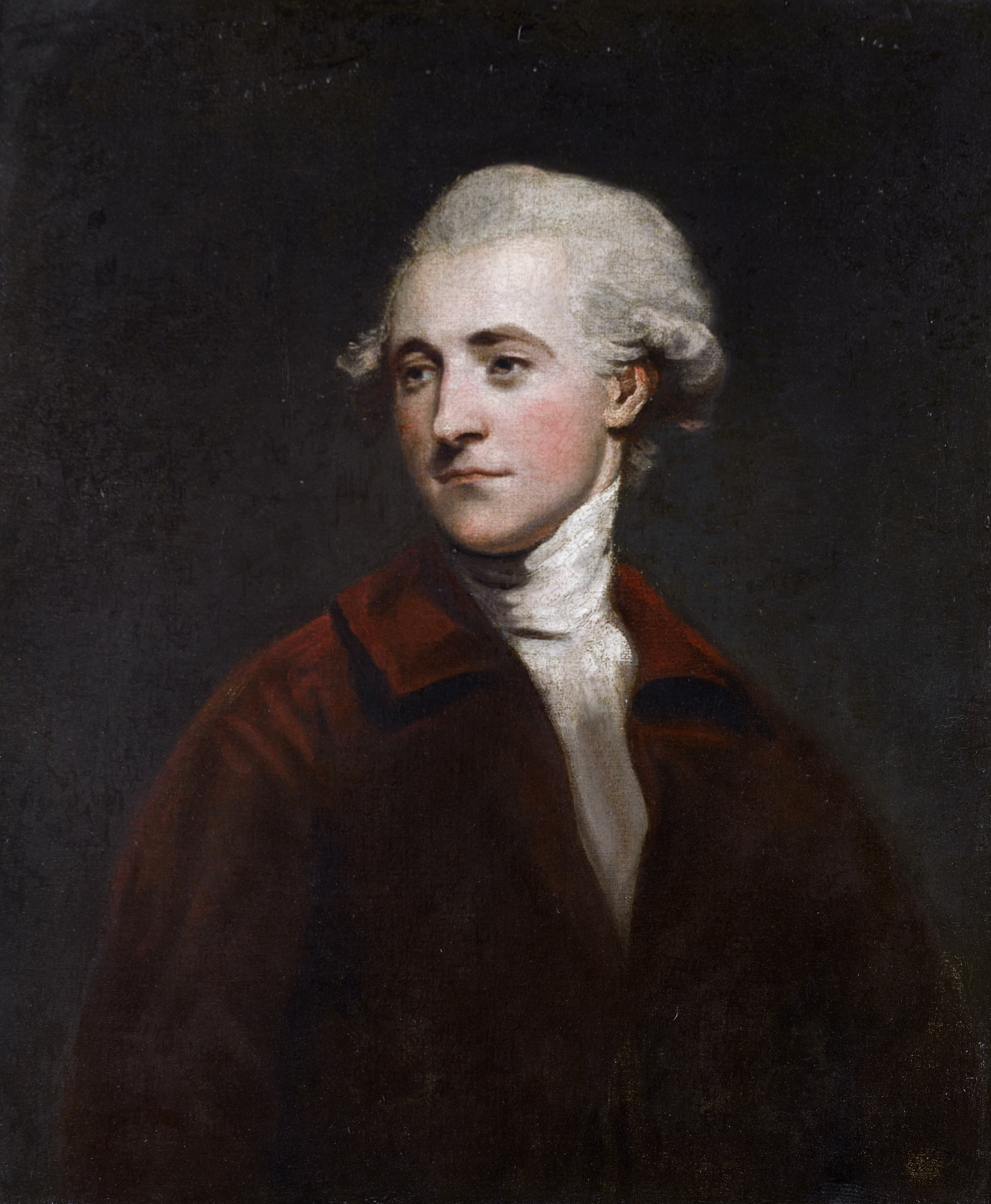
Richard Burke Jr.

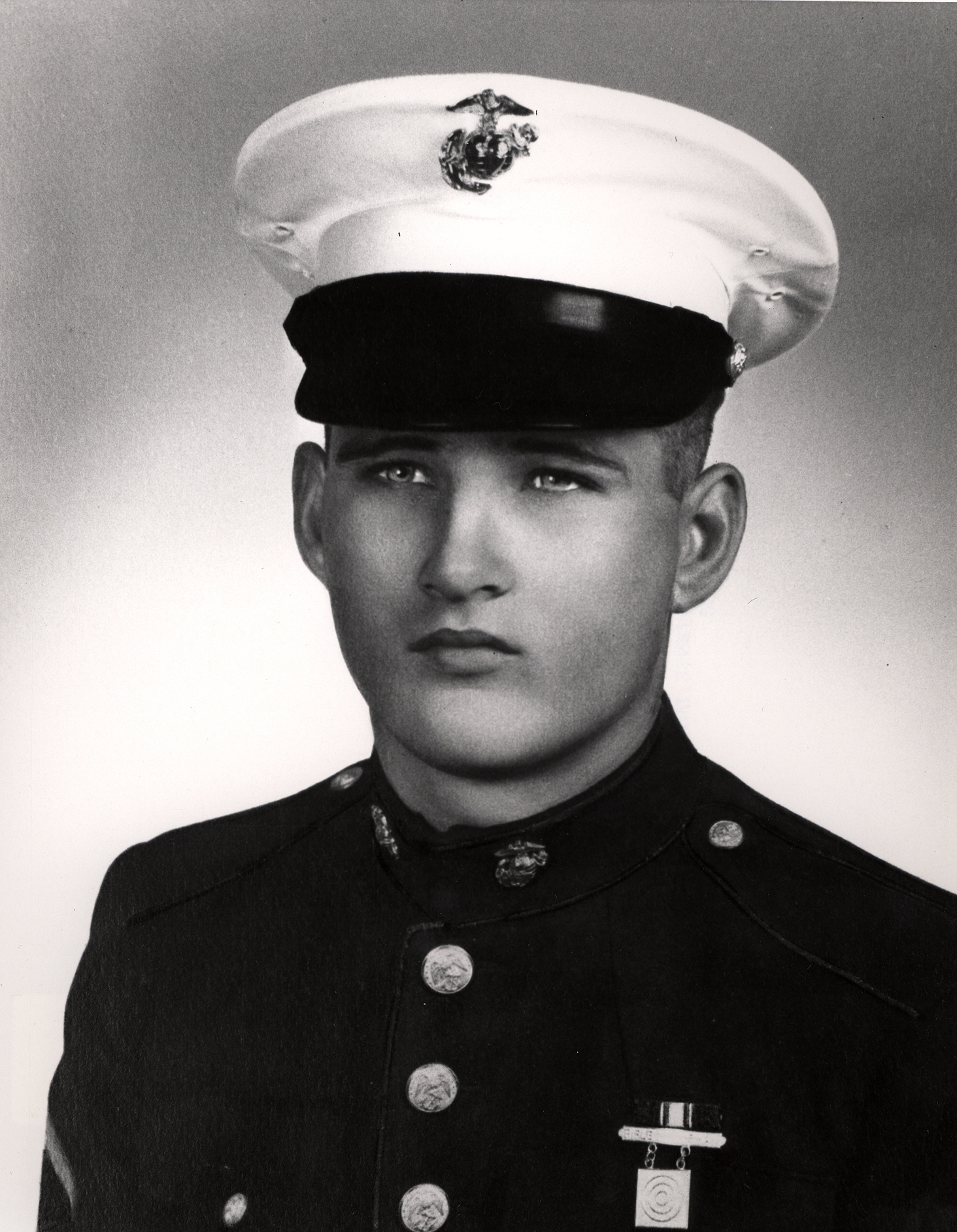
Robert C. Burke

- Rachel Burke, American politician
- Randy Burke (1955–2025), American football player
- Raymond Burke (disambiguation), multiple people, including:
  - Raymond Burke (clarinetist) (1904–1986), New Orleans jazz clarinetist
  - Raymond H. Burke (1881–1954), United States politician from Ohi
  - Raymond Leo Burke (born 1948), American Roman Catholic prelate
  - Raymond Burke (priest) (died 1562), Irish priest
  - Ray Burke (Irish politician) (Raphael Patrick Burke, born 1943), Irish politician
- Redmond Burke, Baron Leitrim (fl. 1580s–1602), Irish noble and soldier
- Redmond Burke (born 1958), American surgeon, innovator, software developer, author, and inventor
- Reece Burke (born 1996), English professional footballer
- Ricard O'Sullivan Burke (1838–1922), Irish nationalist and American soldier, campaigner, and engineer
- Richard Burke (disambiguation), multiple people, including:
  - Richard Burke Jr. (1758–1794), Member of Parliament, son of Edmund Burke
  - Richard Burke (Irish politician) (1932–2016), Irish Fine Gael politician and European Commissioner
  - Richard Anthony Burke (born 1949), Irish bishop in the Roman Catholic Church
  - Richard J. Burke (1915–1999), Irish-American journalist, poet and playwright
  - Richard Burke, 2nd Earl of Clanricarde or Richard (Sassanach) Burke (d. 1582), Irish noble
  - Richard Burke, 4th Earl of Clanricarde or Richard de Burgh (1572–1635), Irish nobleman and politician
  - Richard Burke, 6th Earl of Clanricarde (d. 1666), Irish peer
  - Richard Burke, 8th Earl of Clanricarde (died 1709), Irish peer
  - Richard Óg Burke, 2nd Clanricarde or Mac William Uachtar (d. 1387), Irish chieftain and noble
  - Richard Óge Burke, 7th Clanricarde or Mac William Uachtar (d. 1519), Irish chieftain and noble
  - Richard Mór Burke, 9th Clanricarde or Mac William Uachtar (d. 1530), Irish chieftain and noble
  - Richard Bacach Burke, 11th Clanricarde or Mac William Uachtar (d. 1538), Irish chieftain and noble
  - Dick Burke (footballer, born 1920) (1920–2004), English football player
  - Dick Burke (Australian footballer) (born 1938), Australian rules footballer for South Melbourne
  - Richard Burke (businessman) (1934–2008), co-founder of Trek Bicycle Corporation
  - Richard Burke (Alabama politician) (1807 or 1808 - 1870), Baptist preacher and Alabama state representative
  - Ricky Burke (born 1990), Scottish footballer
- Richie Burke (born 1962), British professional footballer
- Robert Burke (disambiguation), multiple people, including:
  - Robert Burke (director) (born 1984), American film director
  - Robert John Burke (born 1960), American actor who starred in Robocop 3
  - Robert C. Burke (1949–1968), Medal of Honor recipient and United States Marine, killed in action in Vietnam
  - Robert Malachy Burke (1907–1998), Irish Christian socialist and philanthropist
  - Robert E. Burke (1847–1901), U.S. Representative from Texas
  - Robert O'Hara Burke (1821–1861), Australian explorer
  - Robert H. Burke (1922–2003), American politician in California
  - Robert P. Burke (born 1961), United States Navy admiral
  - Robert Easton (actor) (Robert Burke, 1930–2011), American actor
- Robyn Burke, American politician
- Ron Burke (disambiguation), multiple people, including:
  - Ron Burke (sportscaster) (born 1963), American anchor/reporter and television personality
  - Ronnie Burke (1921–2003), British footballer
- Ronan Burke (born 1990), Irish hurler
- Rory Burke (rugby union) (born 1994), Irish rugby union player
- Rosetta Burke (born 1937), American senior officer of the United States Army Reserve
- Ryan Burke (born 2000), Irish professional footballer

=== S ===
Sailor Burke

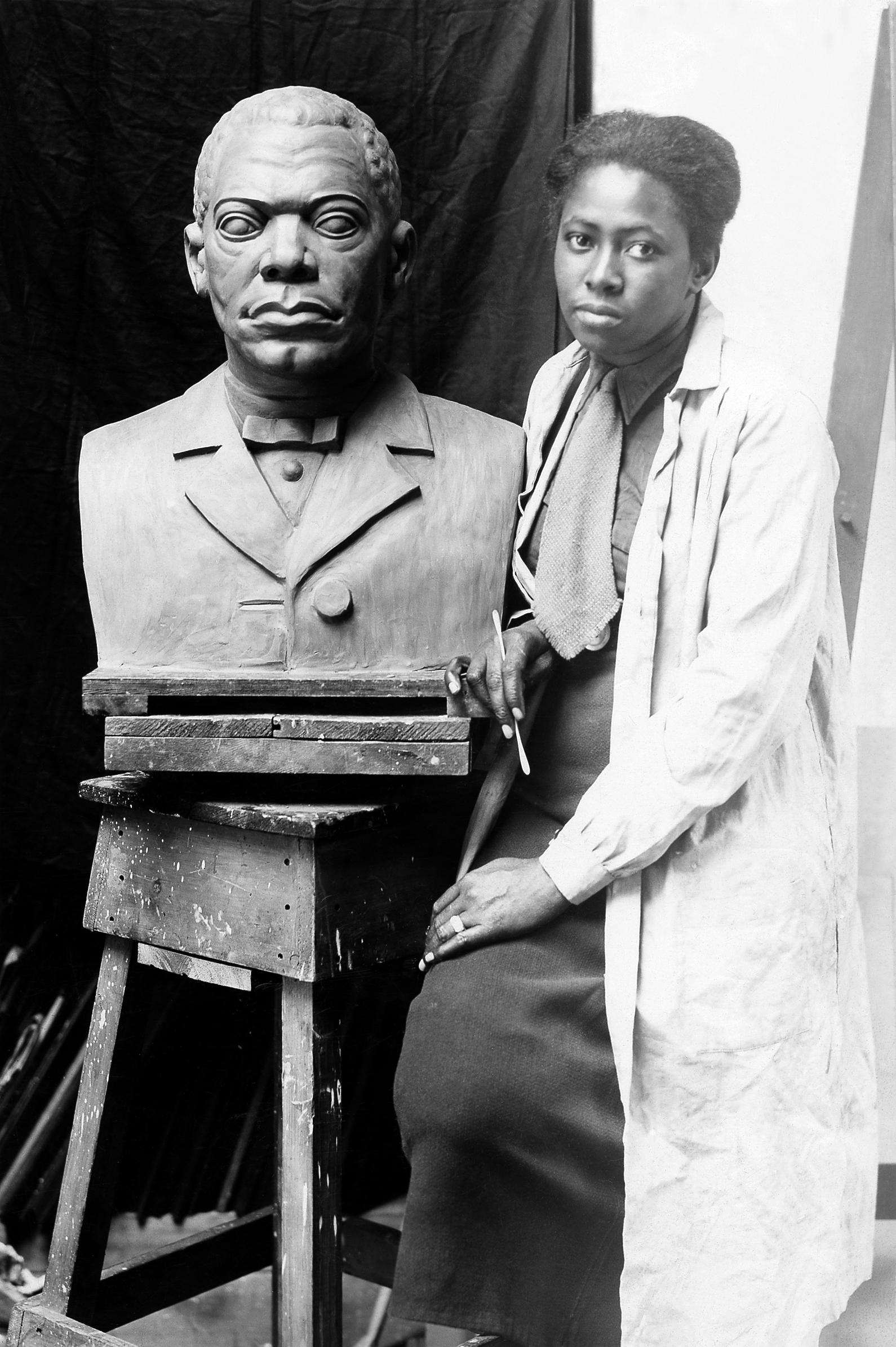
Selma Burke

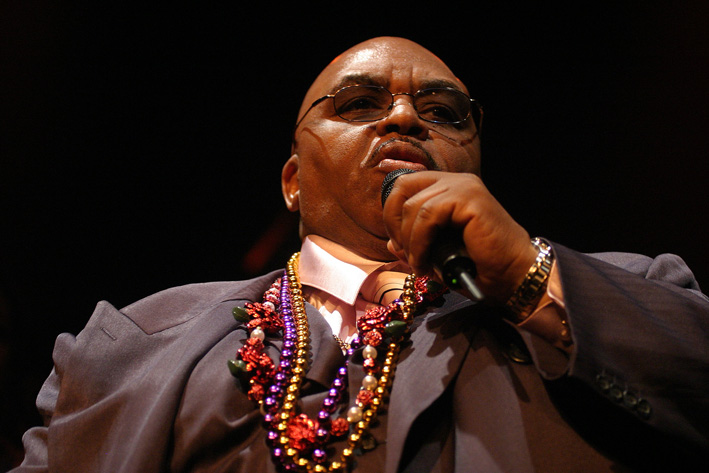
Solomon Burke

- Sailor Burke or Charles Presser (1885–1960), American welter and middleweight boxer
- Sam Burke, West Indies cricket umpire
- Samson Burke or Sam Burke (born 1929), Canadian bodybuilder, swimmer, wrestler and actor
- Samuel Burke (born 1985/6), American journalist
- Samuel Martin Burke (1906–2010), Pakistani diplomat
- Sarah Burke (1982–2012), Canadian freestyle skier
- Séamus Burke (1893–1967), Irish politician
- Seán Burke (disambiguation), multiple people, including:
  - Seán Burke (Gaelic footballer) (born 1970), Irish retired Gaelic footballer
  - Seán Burke (hurler), Irish hurler
  - Sean Burke (born 1967), Canadian former professional ice hockey goaltender
  - Seán Burke (literary theorist) and author
  - Sean M. Burke, author, linguist and programmer
  - Sean Burke (born 1999), American baseball player
  - Sean Burke, English musician and former member of Tubeway Army
  - Shawn Burke, of Hamilton Tiger-Cats
- Selma Burke (1900–1995), American sculptor
- Shannon Burke (disambiguation), multiple people, including:
  - Shannon Burke, host of the Shannon Burke Show, a radio show on WTKS Real Radio in Orlando, Florida
  - Shannon Burke (writer) (born 1966), American novelist and screenwriter
- Simon Burke (born 1961), Australian actor
- Sinéad Burke (born 1990), Irish writer, academic and disability activist
- Solomon Burke (1936/40–2010), American soul singer ("Everybody Needs Somebody to Love")
- Sonny Burke (1914–1980), American musician
- Stanley Burke (1923–2016), Canadian television journalist
- Steve Burke (disambiguation), multiple people, including:
  - Steve Burke (baseball) (born 1955), former Major League Baseball pitcher
  - Steve Burke (businessman) (born 1958), Chairman of NBCUniversal
  - Steve Burke (footballer) (born 1960), English former footballer
  - Steve Burke (composer) (born 1974), British video game composer, sound designer and voice actor
  - Steven Burke (born 1988), English track and road cyclist
  - Steven Burke (born 1984), American Real Estate Agent, Broker, and Auctioneer. Certified CDL
- Stoney Burke (born 1953), American California street performer and actor
- Sue Burke (born 1955), American writer and translator
- Susan Burke (disambiguation), multiple people, including:
  - Susan L. Burke (born 1962), American lawyer
  - Susan Theresa Burke, American writer, actress and stand-up comic
- Syd Burke (1938–2010), Jamaican-British broadcaster, photographer and journalist
- Sydney Burke (1934–2017), South African cricketer

=== T ===
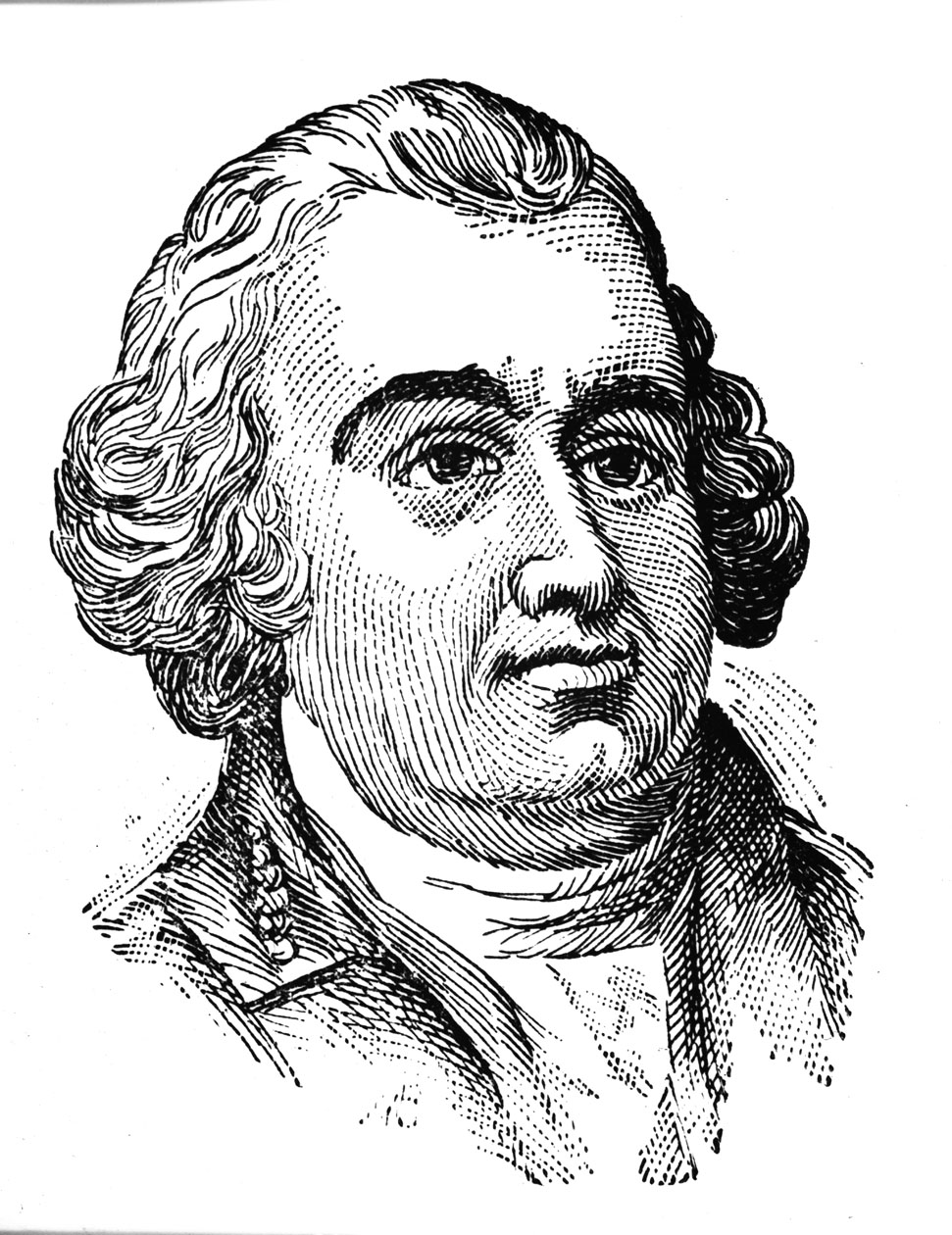
Thomas Burke

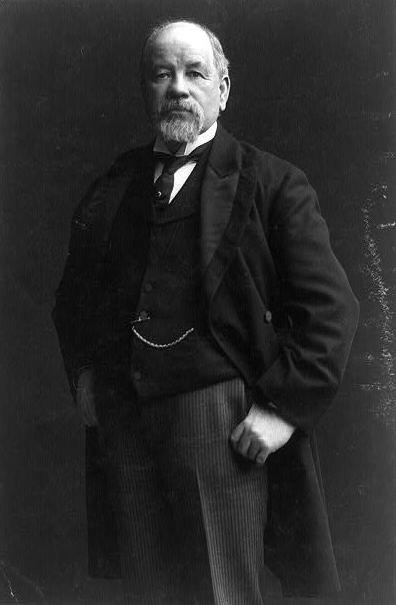
Thomas Burke

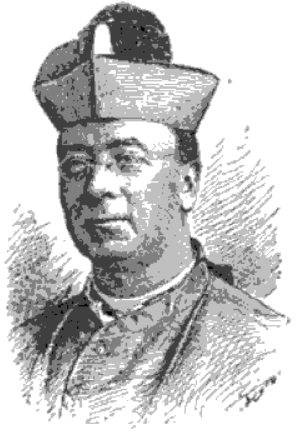
Thomas Martin Aloysius Burke

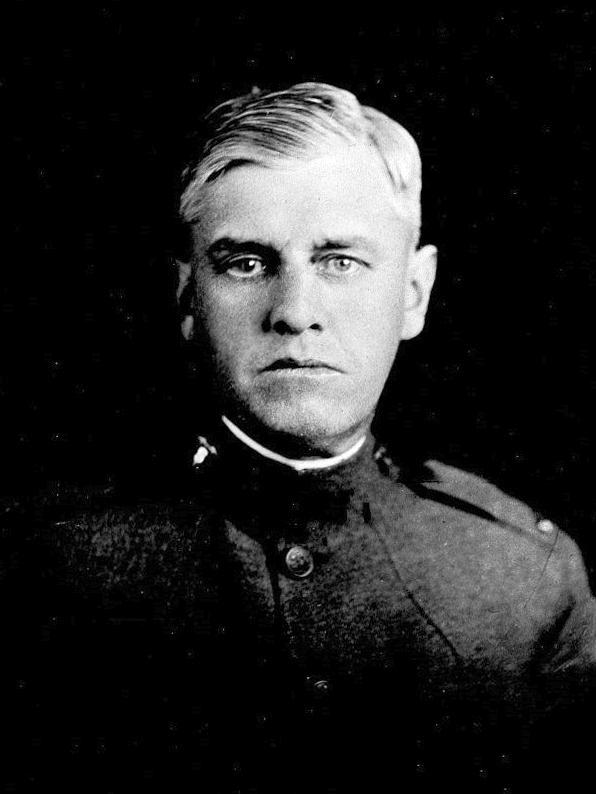
Thomas Burke

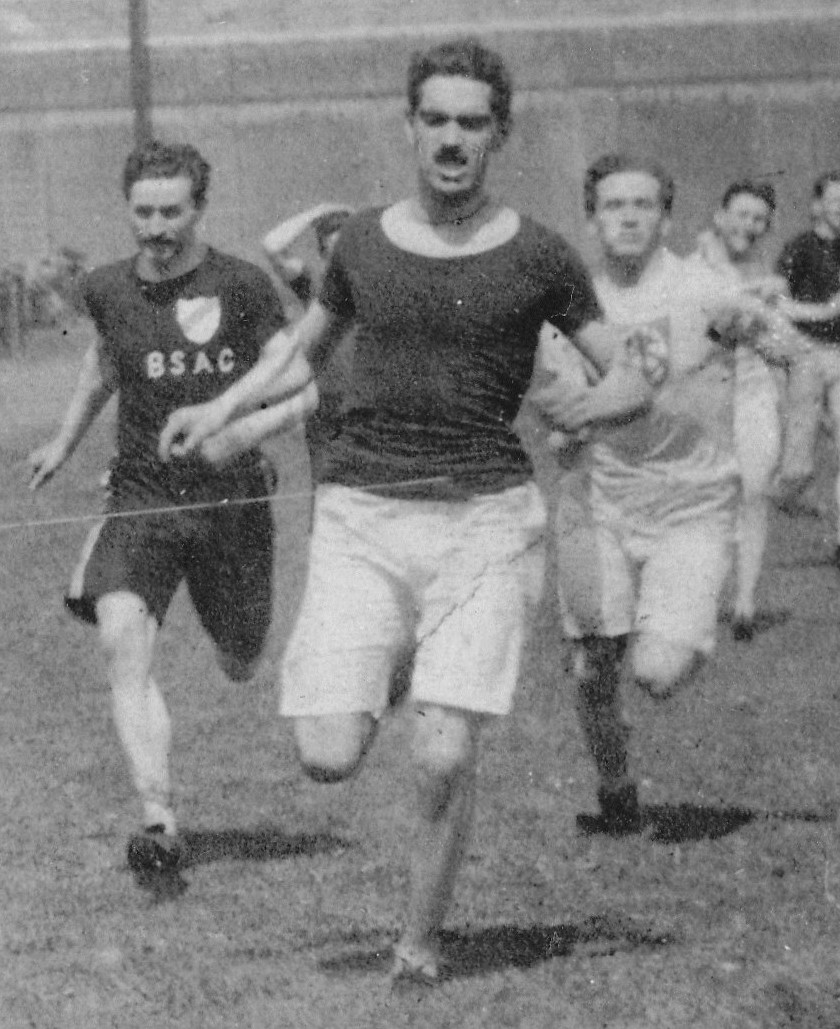
Tom Burke

- Tarana Burke (born 1973), American activist
- Ted Burke (1877–1967), Australian rules footballer
- Teresa Blankmeyer Burke, American philosopher
- Terry Burke (born 1942), Australian politician
- Sir Theobald Burke, 13th Baronet or Theobald Hubert Burke (1833–1909), Irish baronet
- Theresa Burke, Canadian writer, journalist and producer
- Thomas Burke (disambiguation), multiple people, including:
  - Thomas Burke (Clare politician) (1876–1951), Irish independent legislator
  - Thomas Burke (North Carolina) (c. 1747–1783), Irish-born physician, lawyer and politician
  - Thomas Burke (Seattle) (1849–1925), American jurist and railroad builder
  - Sir Thomas Burke, 3rd Baronet (1813–1875), Irish legislator
  - Thomas A. Burke (1898–1971), American Democratic city executive and legislator from Ohio
  - Thomas Henry Burke (civil servant) (1829–1882), Irish Catholic Permanent Under Secretary in Britain's Irish Office
  - Thomas Henry Burke (politician) (1904–1959), American politician from Ohio
  - Thomas J. Burke (North Dakota judge) (1896–1966), American jurist; justice of North Dakota Supreme Court
  - Tom Burke (Australian politician) (1910–1973), Labor Party legislator for the Division of Perth
  - Kerry Burke or Sir Thomas Kerry Burke (born 1942), New Zealand Labour Party Member of Parliament for Rangiora and West Coast
  - T. J. Burke (Thomas James Burke, born 1972), American-born Canadian legislator
  - Thomas Burke (bishop) (c. 1709–1776), Irish Roman Catholic clergyman
  - Thomas Nicholas Burke (1830–1882), Irish Roman Catholic theologian and preacher
  - Thomas Martin Aloysius Burke (1840–1915), Irish-born Roman Catholic clergyman
  - Tom Burke (priest) (1923–2008), Irish Carmelite priest, physicist and school teacher
  - Tom Burke (footballer) (1862–1914), Welsh footballer
  - Tom Burke (hurler) (fl. 1865–1887), Irish hurler
  - Thomas Burke (athlete) (1875–1929), American sprinter in 1896 Athens Olympics
  - Tom Burke (American football) (born 1976), American defensive end in National Football League
  - Tom Burke (Irish footballer), Ireland footballer
  - William Burke (pirate) (died 1699), sometimes known as Thomas Burke, Irish pirate active in the Caribbean, associate of William Kidd
  - Thomas Burke (artist) (1749–1815), Irish engraver and painter known for mezzotint
  - Thomas Burke (author) (1886–1945), English poet and author
  - Thomas Burke (businessman) (1870–1949), Australian businessman and philanthropist
  - Thomas Burke (Irish revolutionary and sportsman) (1894–1967), Irish revolutionary, sportsman and referee
  - Thomas Burke (Medal of Honor sailor) (1833–1883), U.S. Navy sailor and peacetime Medal of Honor recipient
  - Thomas Burke (Medal of Honor soldier) (1842–1902), Medal of Honor recipient for valor on June 30, 1863
  - Thomas Burke (tenor) (1890–1969), British operatic tenor
  - Thomas Ulick Burke (1826–1867), bank manager and victim of the Break-o-Day murder in gold-rush Victoria
  - Tom Burke (actor) (born 1981), English television, film and stage actor
  - Tom Burke (environmentalist) (born 1938), British academic and writer on environmental policy issues
  - Tom Burke (RAF officer), British pilot and senior Royal Air Force officer
  - Tomás Burke (fl. 1600–02), Irish gentleman and soldier
- Tim Burke (disambiguation), multiple people, including:
  - Tim Burke (ice hockey) (born 1955), American ice hockey player/coach
  - Tim Burke (baseball) (born 1959), Major League Baseball pitcher
  - Tim Burke (biathlete) (born 1982), American biathlete
  - Tim Burke (gridiron football), American football coach
  - Tim Burke (visual effects supervisor) (born 1965)
  - Tim Burke (wrestler) (1960–2011), American professional wrestler
  - Tim Burke (golfer) (born 1986), American golfer
  - Timothy Burke (businessman), contractor and railroad owner
  - Timothy Burke (politician) (1866–1926), member of the Wisconsin Legislature
- Toby Bourke, Irish singer-songwriter
- Tomás Burke (fl. 1600–02), Irish gentleman and soldier
- Tony Burke (born 1969), Australian politician
- Travis Burke (born 2003), American football player
- Trey Burke (disambiguation), multiple people, including:
  - Trey Burke (born 1992), American basketball player
  - Trey Burke (racing driver), (born 2004), American racing driver
- Trudy Burke (born 1991), Australian association football player
- Tyler Clark Burke, Canadian artist, illustrator, designer, and writer

=== U ===
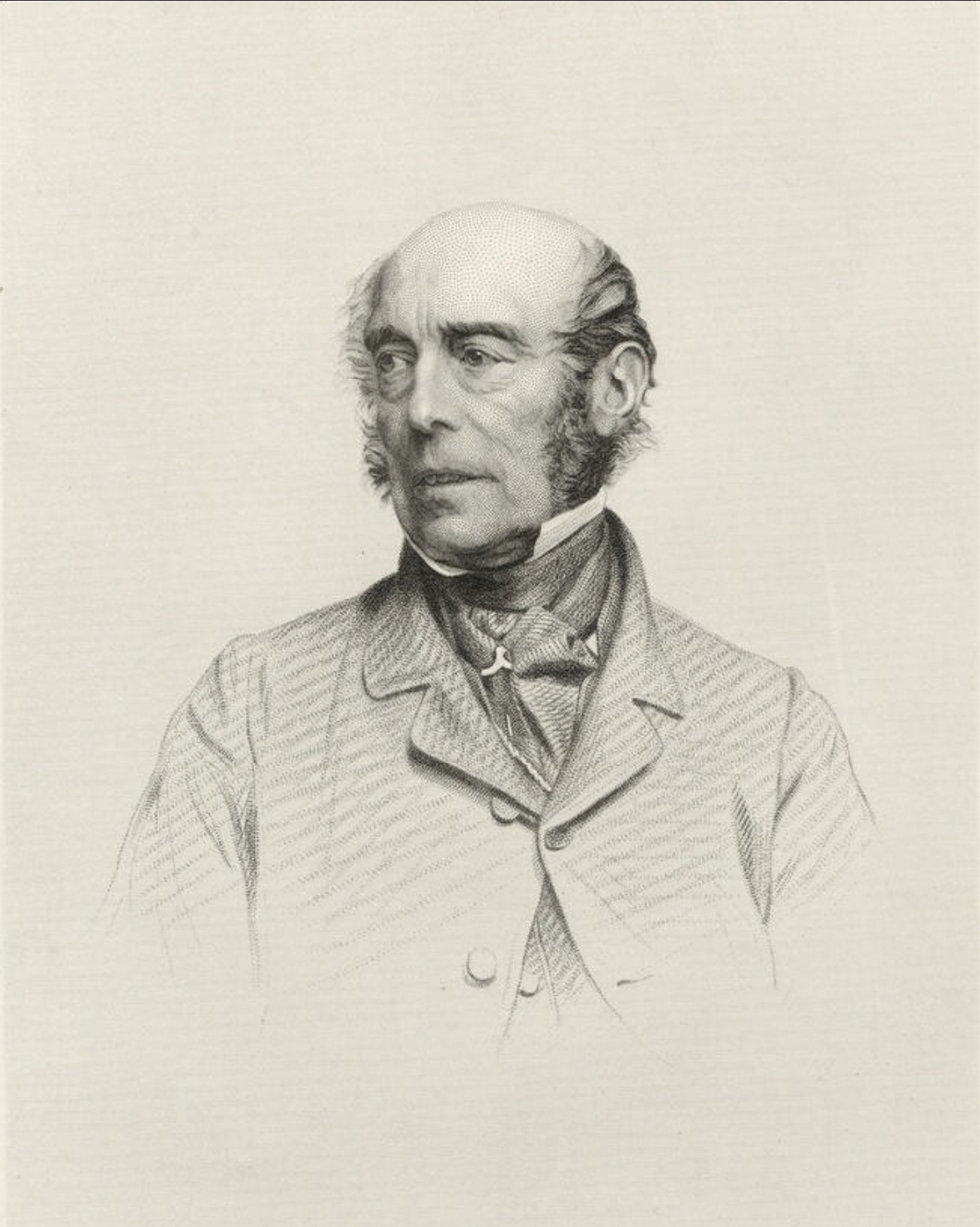
Ulick de Burgh, 1st Marquess of Clanricarde

- Ulick Burke (disambiguation), multiple people, including:
  - Ulick Burke of Umhaill (died 1343), founder of the Bourkes of the Owles
  - Uilleag de Burgh or Sir Ulick Burke, 1st Clanricarde or Mac William Uachtar (d.1343 or 1353), Irish chieftain and noble
  - Ulick an Fhiona Burke, 3rd Clanricarde or Mac William Uachtar (d. 1424), Irish chieftain and noble
  - Ulick Ruadh Burke, 5th Clanricarde or Mac William Uachtar (d. 1485), Irish chieftain and noble
  - Ulick Fionn Burke, 6th Clanricarde or Mac William Uachtar (d. 1509), Irish chieftain and noble
  - Ulick Óge Burke, 8th Clanricarde or Mac William Uachtar (d. 1520), Irish chieftain and noble
  - Ulick na gCeann Burke, 1st Earl of Clanricarde and 12th Clanricarde or Mac William Uachtar (d. 1544), Irish noble
  - Ulick Burke, 3rd Earl of Clanricarde, 3rd Earl of Clanricarde (d. 1601), Irish peer
  - Ulick Burke, 1st Marquess of Clanricarde or Ulick MacRichard Burke (1604–1657), Anglo-Irish nobleman
  - Ulick Burke, 1st Viscount Galway (c. 1670–1691), Irish peer and army officer
  - Sir Ulick Burke, 3rd Baronet (died 1708), of Glinsk, MP for Galway County
  - Ulick Canning de Burgh, Lord Dunkellin (1827–1867), Anglo-Irish soldier and politician
  - Ulick de Burgh, 1st Marquess of Clanricarde (1802–1874), British whig politician
  - Ulick Burke (politician) (born 1943), Irish Fine Gael politician
  - Peter Burke (historian), or Ulick Peter Burke (born 1937), British historian

=== V ===
- Vanley Burke (born 1951) is a British Jamaican photographer and artist
- Vern Burke (born April 30, 1941), American football player
- Victor Burke, Irish-born actor, voiceover artist, and entrepreneur
- Vincent Burke (disambiguation), multiple people, including:
  - Vincent P. Burke (1878–1953), Canadian politician
  - Vincent S. Burke (1920–2001), American politician
  - Vincent Burke (producer) (1952–2022), New Zealand film and television producer
- Vinnie Burke (1921–2001), American jazz bassist
- Virginia M. Burke (1916–1978), American composition and literature scholar

=== W ===
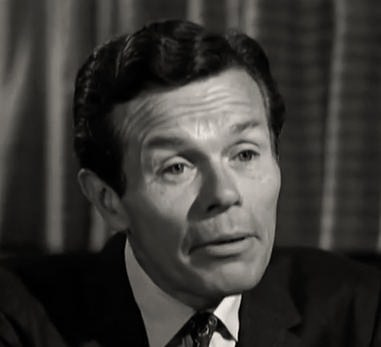
Walter Burke

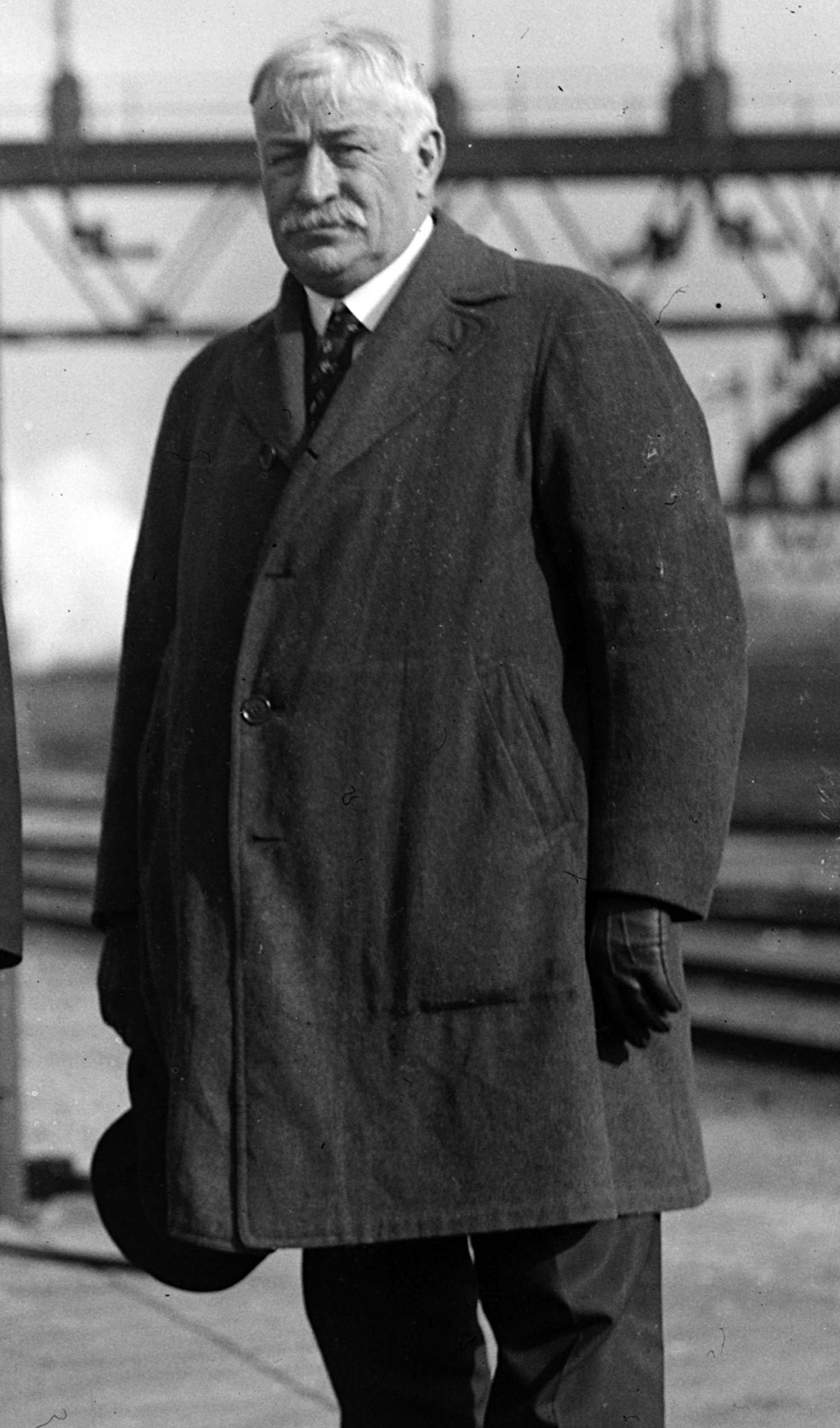
William J. Burke

- Walter Burke (disambiguation),

multiple people, including:

  - Walter Burke (1908–1984), American actor
  - Walter Burke (purser) (1736–1815), English sailor on HMS Victory when Lord Nelson died
  - Walter Burke (hurler) (born 1981), Irish hurler
  - W.S. Burke or Walter Samuel Burke (born 1861), British outdoorsman, sports writer, editor, entertainer
- Wilfrid Burke (1889–1968), British Trade union organiser and politician
- William Burke (disambiguation), multiple people, including:
  - William Burke (pirate) (died 1699), Irish pirate active in the Caribbean, associate of William Kidd
  - William Burke (Burke and Hare murders) (1792–1829), Irish-Scots serial killer
  - William Burke (author) (1729–1798), English pamphleteer
  - William J. Burke (1862–1925), American politician and businessman
  - William Burke (baseball) (1865–1939), 19th-century baseball player
  - William L. Burke (1941–1996), astronomy, astrophysics, and physics professor at UC Santa Cruz
  - William Burke Miller (1904–1983), newspaper and radio reporter
  - William Burke (prior) (c. 1611–c. 1685), Irish Dominican
  - William Malachy Burke (1819–1879), Irish physician and Registrar General
  - William H. Burke, head coach of the College of William & Mary's football team in 1899
  - William H. Burke Jr. (1906–1975), American political figure
  - William mac Ulick Burke, 4th Clanricarde or Mac William Uachtar (d. 1430), Irish chieftain and noble
  - William Burke, 7th Earl of Clanricarde (died 1687), Irish peer
  - William Burke, Lord of Bealatury (fl. 1580s-1616), Irish noble and soldier
  - Willie Burke (born 1972), former Irish footballer
  - William Burke-White, American law professor and policy advisor
- Wylie Burke, American geneticist

=== Y ===
- Yvonne Burke (disambiguation), multiple people, including:
  - Yvonne Brathwaite Burke (born 1932), American politician and lawyer from California
  - Yvonne Burke (Garda), (born 1970), Irish police (Garda Síochána) officer

== Given name ==
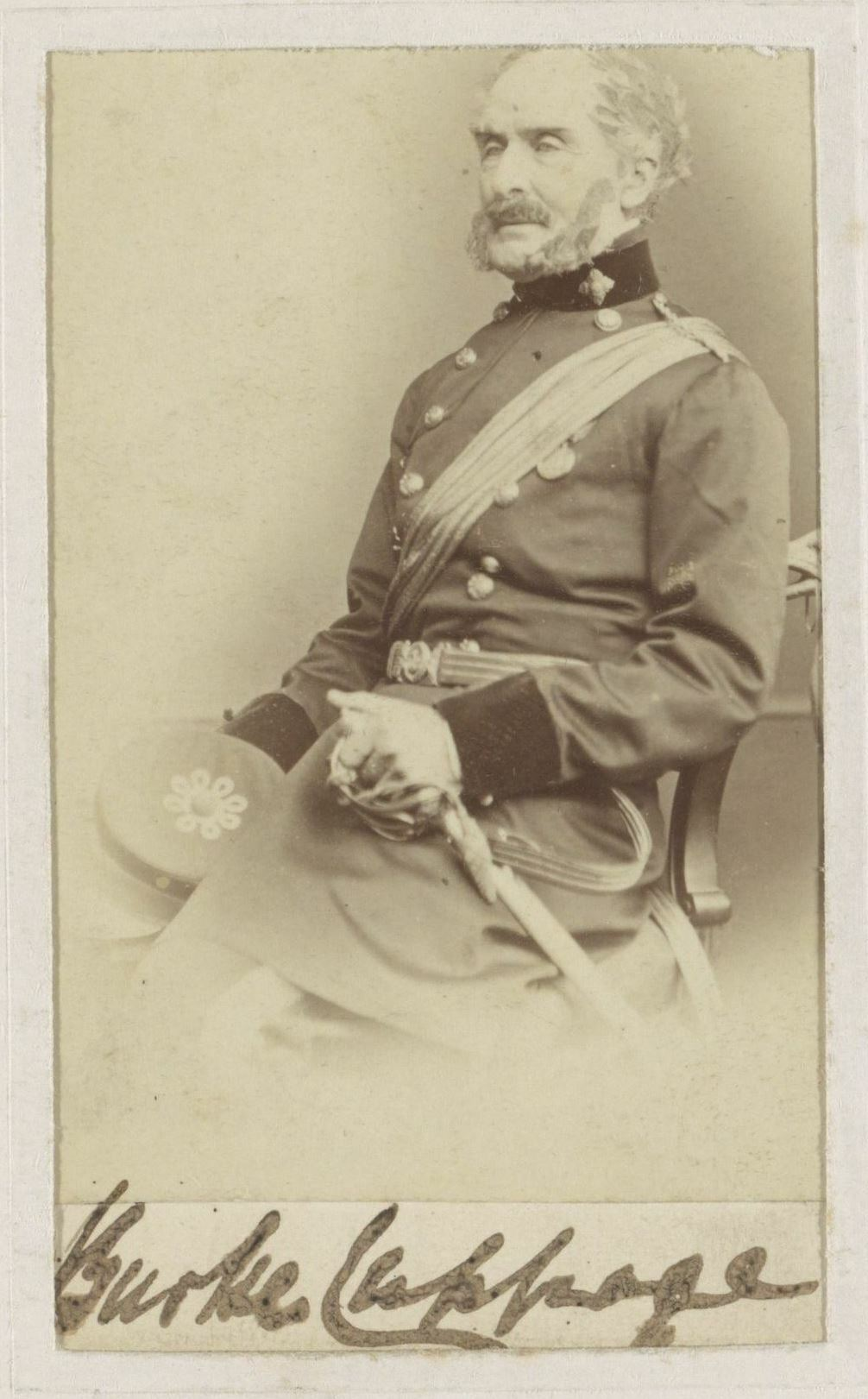
Burke Cuppage

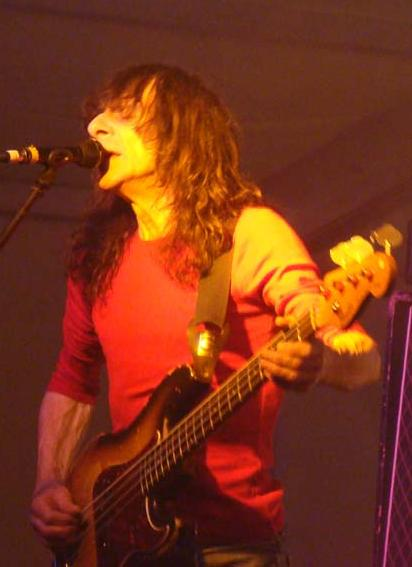
Burke Shelley

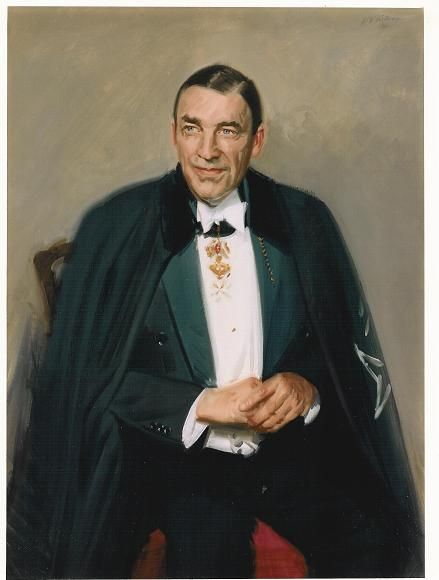
Charles Burke Elbrick

- Burke Badenhop (born 1983), American professional baseball player
- Burke Boyce (1901–1969), American fencer
- Burke Byrnes (born 1937), American actor
- Burke Cuppage or Sir Burke Douglas Cuppage (1794–1877), British Army officer
- Burke Dales (born 1977), Canadian professional football punter
- Burke Day (1954–2017), American politician
- Burke Deadrich (1945–2012), American wrestler
- Burke Fahling (born 1997), American professional soccer player
- Burke Hanford or Burke Gaius Hanford (1872–1928), American sailor
- Burke Harr (born 1971), American politician from Nebraska
- Burke Henry (born 1979), Canadian professional ice hockey player
- Burke Jackson (born 1949), American rancher and politician
- Burke Jones (1903–1983), American soccer player
- Burke Marshall (1922–2003), American lawyer
- Burke Moses (born 1959), American actor
- Burke Ramsey (born 1987), brother of Jonbenét Ramsey
- Burke Reid, Australian–Canadian record producer and musician
- Burke Riley (1914–2006), American legislator, lawyer and public official
- Burke Roberts, American underground film director and multimedia artist
- Burke Shelley (1950–2022), Welsh rock musician
- Burke Thomas or Burke Thomas Overdrive, American musician and record producer
- Burke Trend, Baron Trend or Burke Frederick St John Trend (1914–1987), British civil servant
- Burke Trieschmann, Vietnamese composer and sound designer
- Burke W. Whitman, American executive, board director, and former United States Marine Corps general
- Charles Burke Elbrick (1908–1983), American ambassador
- Edmond Roche, 1st Baron Fermoy or Edmond Burke Roche (1815–1874), Irish politician
- Edmund Roche, 5th Baron Fermoy or Edmund James Burke Roche (1939–1984), British businessman
- Herschel Burke Gilbert (1918–2003), American orchestrator, musical supervisor, and composer
- James Roche, 3rd Baron Fermoy or James Boothby Burke Roche (1851–1920), British peer
- Mary Burke Washington or Mary Cornelia Burke Washington (formerly Mary Burke Nicholas), (1926–2014), American economist
- Morris Burke Belknap (the elder) or Morris Burke Belknap Sr (1780–1877), American industrialist
- Morris B. Belknap or Morris Burke Belknap Jr or "the younger" (1856–1910), American businessman
- Maurice Roche, 4th Baron Fermoy or Edmund Maurice Burke Roche (1885–1955), British Conservative Party politician
- Maurice Roche, 6th Baron Fermoy or (Patrick) Maurice Burke Roche (born 1967), British businessman
- Nadine Burke Harris (born 1975) is a Canadian-American pediatrician
- Patricia Burke Brogan (1926–2022), Irish playwright, novelist, poet and artist
- Ralph Burke Tyree (1921–1979), American artist
- W. B. Belknap or William Burke Belknap Sr or "the elder" (1811–1889), American businessman
- William Burke Belknap or William Burke Belknap Jr or "the younger" (1885–1965), American entrepreneur and economist
- William B. Garrett III or William Burke Garrett III, American army officer
- William Burke Kirwan (c. 1814–1880?), Irish painter and murderer

== By title ==
- Attorney General Burke (disambiguation)
- General Burke (disambiguation)
- Governor Burke (disambiguation)
- Justice Burke (disambiguation)
- Senator Burke (disambiguation)

== Fictional characters ==
- Burke, a character from Star Trek VI: The Undiscovered Country
- Burke, the antihero protagonist of the Burke Series of novels by Andrew Vachss
- Burke, a character from Rampage played by Joe Manganiello
- Burke Breyer, a fictional character in the film Shazam!
- Burke Dennings, a fictional character played by Jack MacGowran in The Exorcist
- Burke Lapadura, a character in the game Identity V
- Burke Ryan, a character in the 2009 American romantic drama movie Love Happens
- Amos Burke, main character in the 1963 television series Burke's Law and its 1994 revival, played by Gene Barry
- Carter J. Burke, a character from the 1986 film Aliens
- Catherine 'Katie' Burke, character in Abandon (film)
- Clyde Burke, a newspaper reporter and one of the agents of The Shadow
- Danny Burke, a character in the 1984 American teen sex comedy movie Revenge of the Nerds
- David Burke, author of a book on Melita Norwood
- David "Bombhead" Burke, a character played by Lee Otway on Hollyoaks
- Doreen Burke, a character from Blow the Man Down (film), played by Marceline Hugot
- Dorothy Burke, a fictional character from the Australian Network Ten soap opera Neighbours
- Elizabeth Burke, a character in the television series White Collar
- Elizabeth Burke, a character in The Faculty
- Hayden Burke, FBI Director from The Silence of the Lambs (film), played by Roger Corman
- Hazel Burke, Shirley Booth's lead character on the NBC/CBS television series, Hazel
- Joseph Burke, a World War II veteran in the novel Double Play from Robert B. Parker
- Juliet Burke, a character from the TV series Lost
- Kevin Burke, a character in the 1998 American sitcom Two of a Kind
- Leslie Burke, a character from Bridge to Terabithia
- DCI Matt Burke, a character in the television series Taggart
- Mel Burke (Hart), a character in the television sitcom Melissa & Joey
- Miss Burke, a character from The Faculty
- Peter Burke, a character from the TV series White Collar
- Preston Burke, a character on Grey's Anatomy
- Dr Richard Burke, Monica's boyfriend on the television sitcom Friends, played by Tom Selleck
- Rick Burke, a character on the television series 24
- Robert Burke, a hunter and dinosaur expert in the film The Lost World: Jurassic Park
- Detective Sam Burke, a policeman in the Spawn series from Image comics
- Steve Burke (One Life to Live), a soap opera character
- Thomas Burke, a character from Final Destination 2
- Thomas Burke, character in Mafia III
- Walter Burke, a character, played by Al Pacino in The Recruit

== See also ==
- Burke (disambiguation)
- De Burgh
- House of Burgh, an Anglo-Norman and Hiberno-Norman dynasty founded in 1193
- Bourke (disambiguation)
- Burk (name), given name and surname
- Burkes, surname
- Burkle (surname), surname
- Berg (disambiguation)
- Berkley (disambiguation)
- Birke, given name and surname
- Burgh, an autonomous corporate entity in Scotland
- Burgos, a city of northern Spain
- Burk (disambiguation)
- Burke and Wills
- Burke and Hare
- Burke's Peerage, account of nobility, first published in 1826 by John Burke
- Burke's Landed Gentry, an account of families of the land-holding class, first published in 1833 by John Burke
