= Michael Burke =

Michael, Mike, Mick or Micky Burke may refer to:

== Politics and law ==
- Michael Burke (New South Wales colonial politician) (1843–1909), Australian politician from New South Wales
- Michael E. Burke (1863–1918), American politician from Wisconsin
- Michael Burke (Australian politician) (1865–1937), Australian politician from New South Wales
- Michael J. Burke (born 1958), Illinois State Supreme Court justice

== Sports ==
- Mike Burke (shortstop) (1854–1889), American Major League Baseball player
- Micky Burke (1904–1984), Scottish football forward
- Mick Burke (mountaineer) (1941–1975), English mountaineer and climbing cameraman
- Mick Burke (Gaelic footballer) (born 1941), Irish Gaelic footballer
- Mike Burke (punter) (born 1950), American football punter
- Mick Burke (rugby league) (born 1958), English rugby league footballer
- Mike Burke (strongman) (born 1974), American professional strongman competitor
- Michael Burke (soccer) (born 1977), American Major League Soccer player
- Michael Burke (Gaelic footballer) (born 1985), Irish Gaelic football player
- E. Michael Burke, former owner of New York Yankees

== Others ==
- Michael Burke, 10th Earl of Clanricarde (1686–1726), Irish peer
- Michael Burke (poet) (c. 1800–1881), Irish poet
- E. Michael Burke (1916–1987), American naval officer, CIA operative, circus, television and sports executive
- Michael Reilly Burke (born 1964), American actor
- Mike Burke (journalist), American journalist and senior producer of Democracy Now!
- Michael Burke (economist), Irish economist
- Michael Burke (bushranger), Australian bushranger
- Michael Burke (businessman), French-American businessman

== See also ==
- Michael Buerk (born 1946), English newsreader and journalist
