= EDHEC Business School =

French business school

Coordinates: 50°40′23″N 3°09′58″E

- École des Hautes Études Commerciales du Nord
- Motto: Unleash Tomorrow
- Type: Grande école, Business school
- Established: 1906; 120 years ago
- Accreditation: Triple accreditation: AACSB; AMBA; EQUIS
- Affiliations: FUPL, CGE
- Budget: €160 million
- Faculty: 167 permanent faculty members and 810 adjunct faculty
- Students: 8,600 (undergraduates and graduates)
- Location: Lille, Nice, Paris, London, Singapore
- Language: English, French
- Colors: Burgundy; White
- Website: https://www.edhec.edu/en

The École des Hautes Études Commerciales du Nord, commonly known as EDHEC Business School or simply EDHEC, is a French business school and grande école founded in 1906. It has campuses in Lille, Nice, and Paris, as well as in London and Singapore.

EDHEC is accredited by EQUIS, AACSB and AMBA (triple accreditation). In 2019, EDHEC had 8,600 students enrolled in traditional graduate and undergraduate programmes, 245 exchange and double-degree agreements, and an alumni network of more than 40,000 members across 125 countries.

EDHEC Business School is generally ranked among the top 4 business schools in France and the top 10 in Europe.

== History ==
=== Founding ===
EDHEC Business School was founded in Lille in 1906 by industrialists from northern France. Initially established as a business section within the school of engineering of the Catholic University of Lille, EDHEC was created with the objective of addressing the economic and industrial needs of northern France. Its founding occurred in the context of the broader Industrial Revolution that transformed northern France in the 19th century. Between 1850 and 1914, Lille and its neighbouring cities became major industrial and financial centres, prompting regional elites to seek ways to prepare their children and future professionals for business careers, ultimately leading to the creation of EDHEC.

The school's teaching was initially inspired by the moral principles of the Church's social doctrine, in line with earlier efforts by Catholic communities to integrate Christian values into business education. The idea for the school first emerged in 1884, during a Catholic congress at which Léon Harmel, a prominent industrialist, called for "the immediate founding of a school of advanced industrial and business studies". The envisioned institution aimed to train both engineers and future business leaders, especially the sons of industrialists, who were seen as essential to promoting Christian ethics in the industrial world.

=== 20th century ===
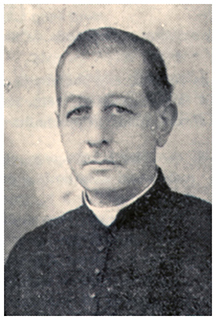
Joseph Peter (1879–1937), first dean of EDHEC.

In 1920, Reverend Joseph Peter, became the first dean of the school. In 1921, the school gained self-governing status and was attached to the law school of the Catholic University of Lille, becoming known as HEC Nord (French: Hautes Études Commerciales du Nord, lit. 'Advanced Business Studies of the North'). Although the school operated autonomously, it shared faculty with the law school, and students were able to pursue joint studies by enrolling in both institutions simultaneously. The curriculum initially included courses in accounting, general administration, economics, and sales methods, complemented by economic geography and foreign languages. Gradually, the school moved away from strictly scientific instruction in favour of subjects focused on business techniques and modern languages. English became compulsory for all students, with additional offerings in German, Spanish, Italian, Slavic languages, and Arabic.

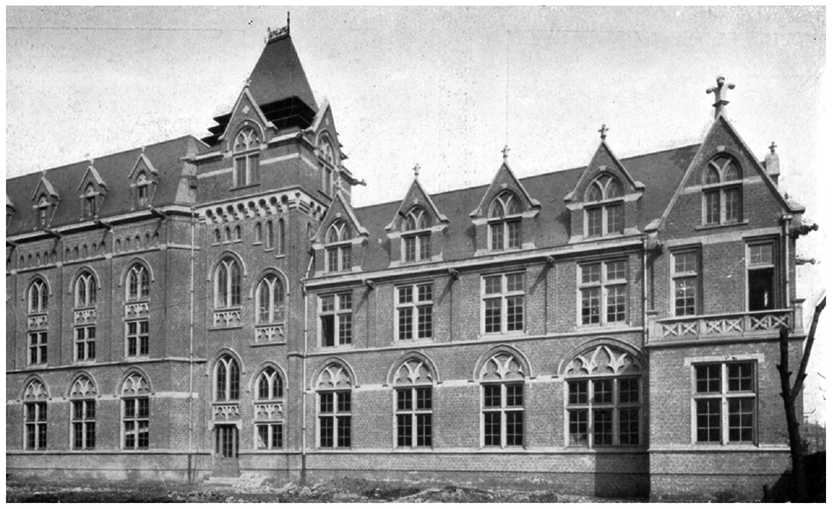
The school building in 1927.

Following a legal dispute with HEC Paris over the use of the name, the institution was renamed EDHEC (French: École des Hautes Études Commerciales du Nord, lit. 'School of Advanced Business Studies of the North') in 1951. The alumni association was founded in 1947 under the name Amicale de l'EDHEC du Nord, later becaming the Association des Diplômés EDHEC. Since 1953, the association has published a bulletin titled Quo Vadis and later renamed EDHEC Informations.

In 1956, EDHEC parted ways with the Catholic University of Lille to establish its own premises. EDHEC became independent two years later, in 1958. While maintaining a partnership with the Catholic University of Lille, EDHEC asserted its independence and distanced itself from the university, which it perceived as insufficiently aligned with its growth and internationalisation strategy. The school received state accreditation in 1971. In 1983, EDHEC signed its first international academic partnership, with the London School of Economics. Olivier Oger was appointed dean in 1988 and served until 2017. Early in his tenure, the school introduced more selective admission processes, revised faculty recruitment practices, and developed its network of international academic partnerships.

=== 21st century ===
In the early 2000s, the school initiated a strategic repositioning around a limited number of specialised fields. Finance was designated as a primary focus, leading to the creation of the EDHEC-Risk Institute with the aim of producing research that could be commercialised and sold to the financial industry. Despite internal opposition, this initiative gained traction, and financial research has become an important part of the school's income. During the same period, the school began hiring international faculty. In 2005, all courses began to be taught exclusively in English. In 2010, the school relocated from the centre of Lille to a new 49-acre campus on the outskirts of the city.

== Academics ==
=== Programmes ===
EDHEC offers a Master in Management (MiM), also known as the Programme Grande École, which is the institution's main degree-granting programme. It is aimed at students with no prior professional experience. The programme selects its students through a competitive examination taken after Classe Préparatoire aux Grandes Écoles (CPGE), a form of undergraduate studies in France. It provides a general education in business and management.

In addition to the Master in Management, EDHEC offers several Master of Science (MSc) and bachelor's degrees, MBA programmes, a PhD in finance and an Executive PhD in Business Management.

=== Reputation and rankings ===
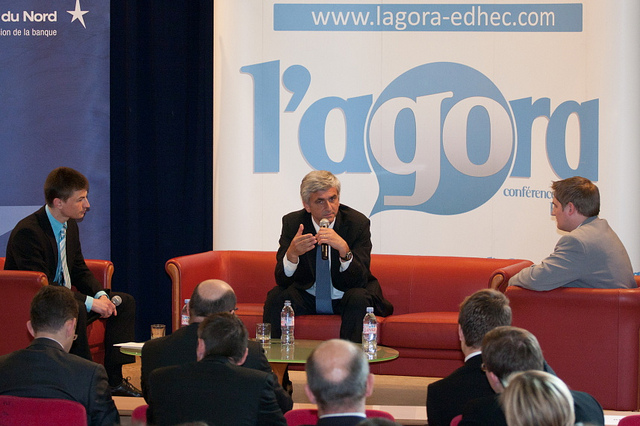
Conference with Hervé Morin at EDHEC.

EDHEC Business School is a Grande école, a type of French higher education institution that operates independently from the public university system, though it often maintains connections with it. Similar to the Ivy League in the United States, Oxbridge in the United Kingdom, and C9 League in China, graduation from a grande école is often considered a key credential for securing top positions in government, administration and the corporate sector in France. A 2024 study by Willis Towers Watson ranked EDHEC in the highest tier of French business schools based on graduate salary outcomes.

European Business Schools

- Financial Times - European Business School Rankings 2024: 7

Master in Management (Programme Grande École)

- Financial Times - Global Ranking 2024: 4

Master in Finance

- Financial Times - Global Ranking 2024: 6

Master in Marketing

- QS World University Rankings - Global Ranking 2025: 10

MBA

- Bloomberg Businessweek - European Ranking 2023/2024: 13

== Research ==
EDHEC Business School conducts academic research with a faculty of over 175 members. The school allocates approximately 20% of its budget to research. The school's research framework includes 13 centers and chairs, which collectively produce over 100 academic articles each year. EDHEC's research is primarily centered on finance, with additional research conducted in fields such as marketing, innovation management, and taxation.

The EDHEC-Risk Institute is a central component of the school's research activities. It combines academic research with practical applications in the financial industry and has established partnerships with firms such as Bloomberg, Amundi, and Morgan Stanley. In 2018, approximately $34 billion in assets tracked indices developed by the EDHEC-Risk Institute.

In 2023, EDHEC sold 93% of its subsidiary, Scientific Beta, to the Singapore Exchange. Valued at €200 million and established in 2012, Scientific Beta focuses on alternative index design. It has developed a global client base, including pension funds and asset managers. The proceeds from this sale were used to finance EDHEC's research projects, including the development of a database for infrastructure investments and a fintech initiative evaluating the financial, social, and environmental risks of long-term investments.

== Campus ==
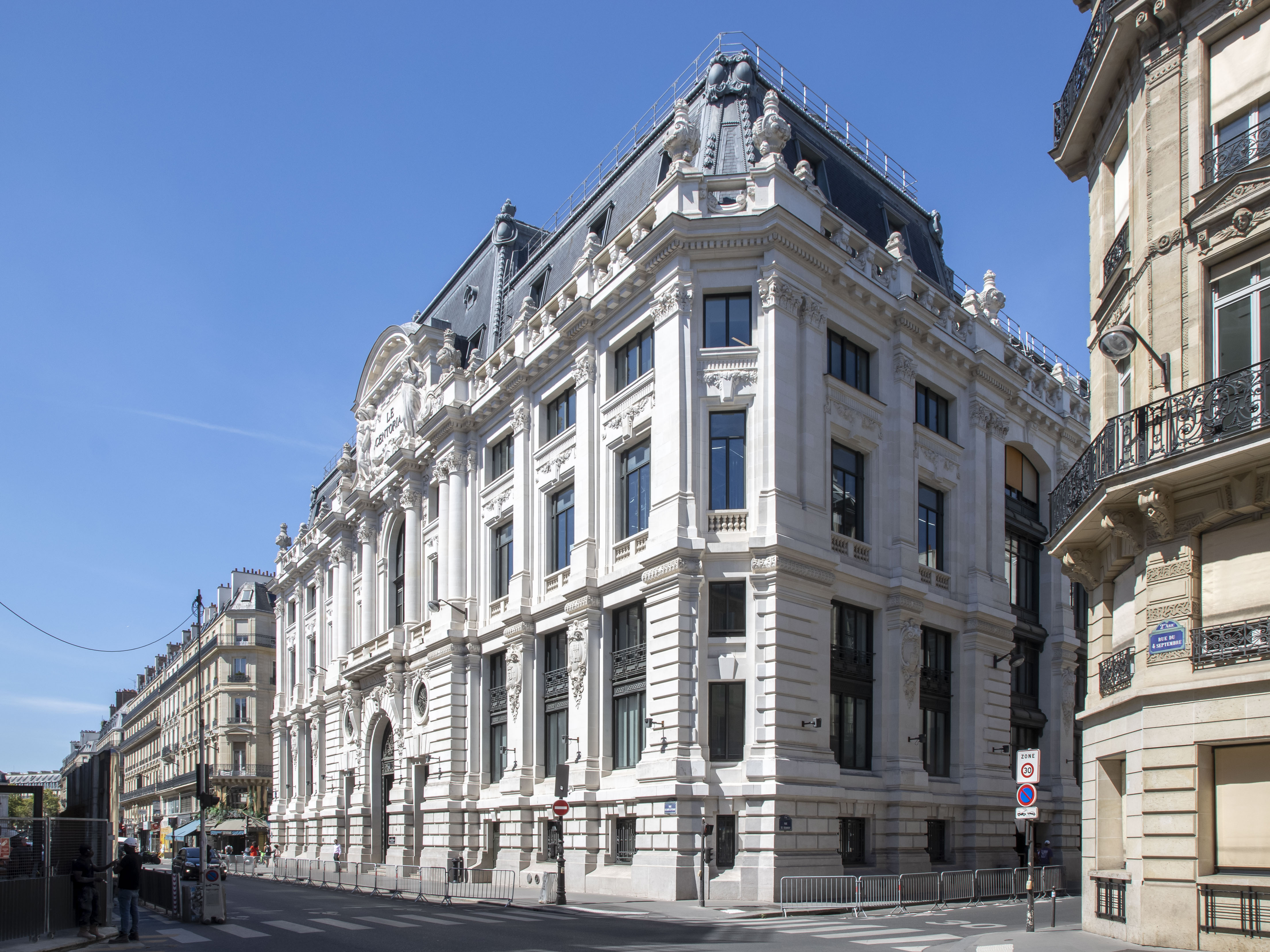
EDHEC's campus in Paris.

The main campus in Lille is set within a 21-acre park, part of a 49-acre estate formerly owned by Eugène Motte-Duthoit (1860–1932), a prominent textile industrialist and political figure in Roubaix. In the 1980s, IBM acquired the property and established its headquarters on the site. It was later occupied by the bank Groupe Caisse d'Épargne, before being purchased by EDHEC Business School, which relocated its campus from Lille's Vauban district in 2010. The ground features century-old trees and includes a manor built in 1924, designed by the architect Jacques Gréber. Located near the main campus, the Jean Arnault campus is named after Bernard Arnault's father and serves both as a training centre and incubator. Donated by the Arnault family in 2021, it occupies the former family home of Bernard Arnault's parents.

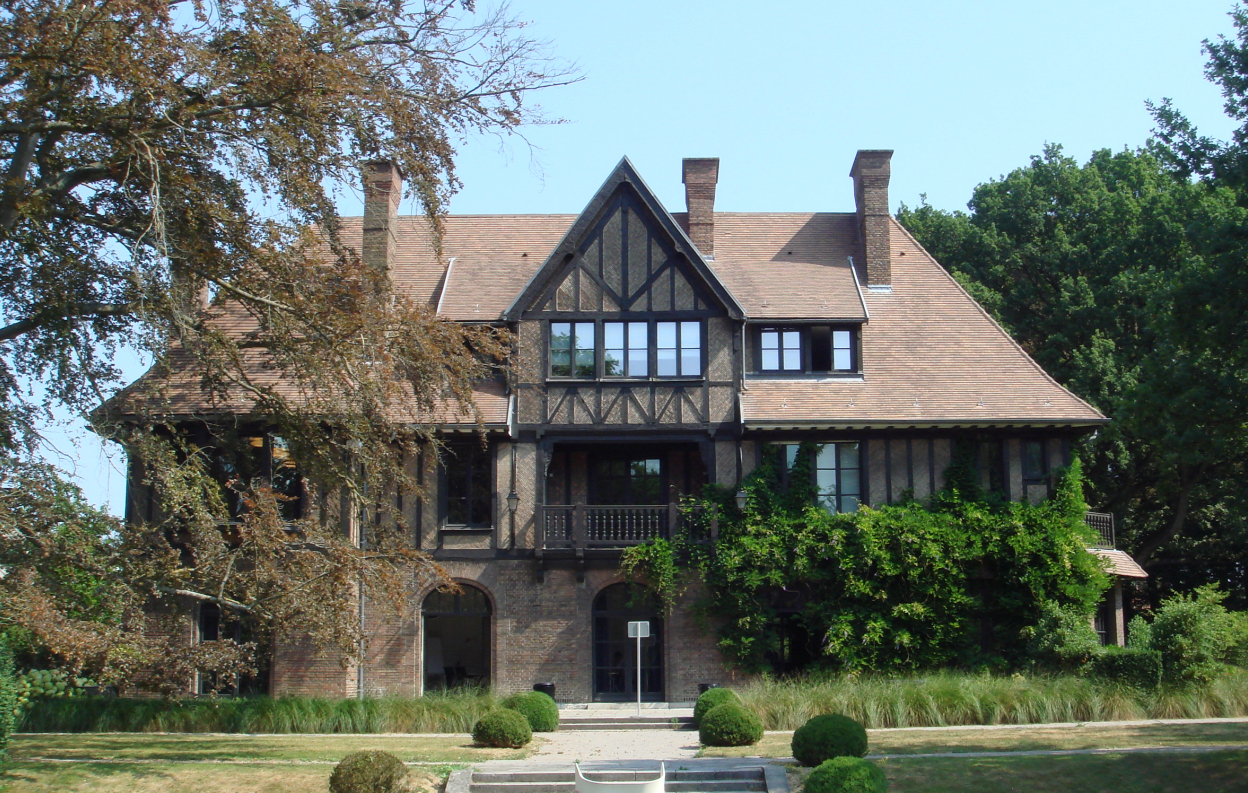
Early 20th-century manor located on the Lille campus.

The Nice campus, inaugurated in 1991, is located by the seaside at the end of the Promenade des Anglais. It was the second campus established by EDHEC Business School.

EDHEC Business School established a presence in Singapore in 2010, at the invitation of the Singaporean government which sought to integrate the school into an academic cluster focused on finance in the region. The London campus houses the PhD in Finance programme, and, along with the Singapore campus, hosts the school's research centres.

The Paris campus was inaugurated in 2012 and is located in the Opéra business district. It occupies part of Le Centorial, a historic building constructed in 1895, which once served as the headquarters of the bank Crédit Lyonnais. The building is listed as a historic monument. EDHEC's startup incubator is located at Station F, a large startup campus in the 13th arrondissement of Paris.

== Student life ==
EDHEC has over 100 student societies in areas such as sports, humanitarian work, arts, finance, and business services.

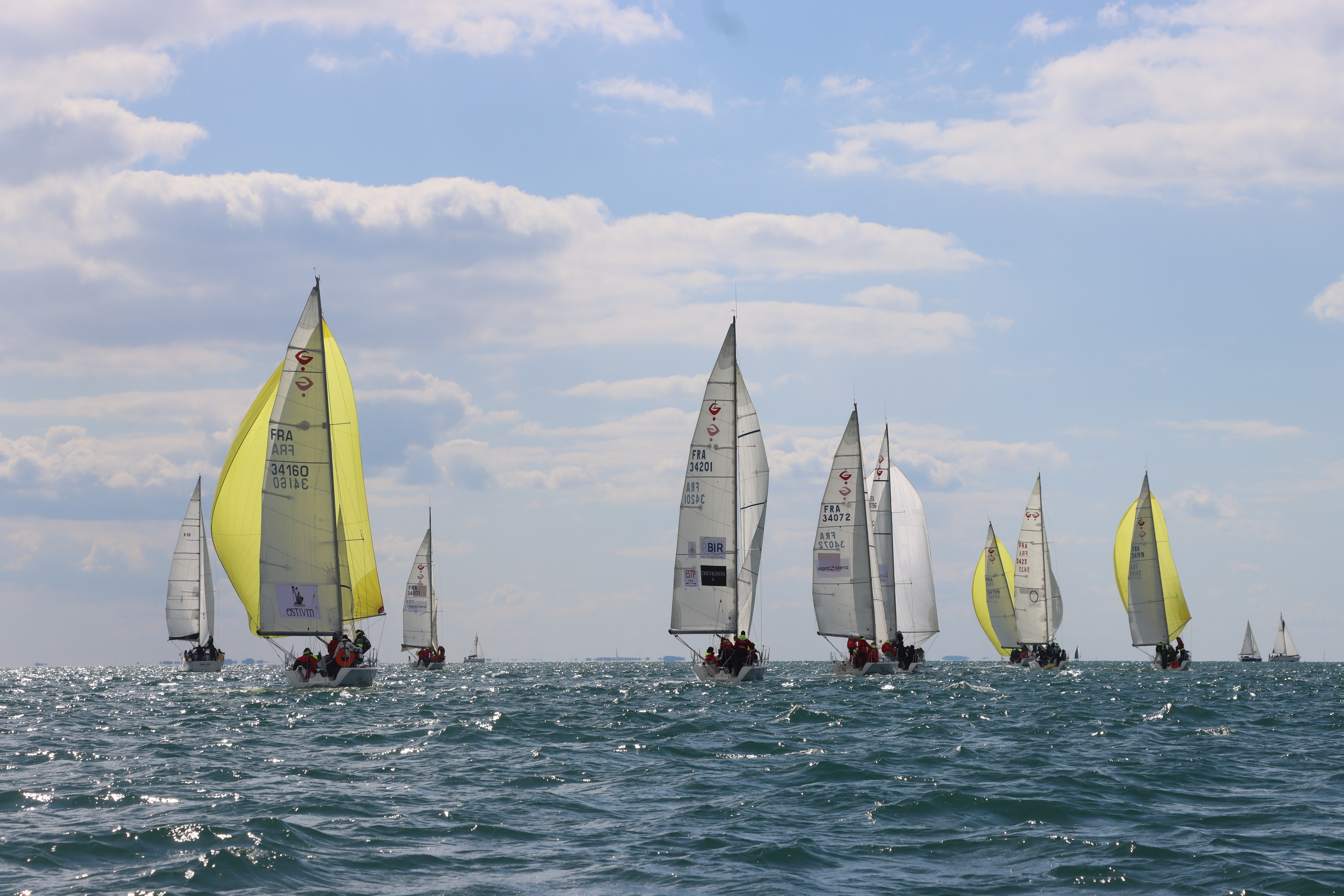
55th EDHEC Sailing Cup.

The EDHEC Sailing Cup is an annual event organised by students. First initiated in 1969 by three students, the event consists of an annual sailing regatta. By 1980, it had become the largest student sporting event in Europe. The event features a series of sport competitions and attracts participants from business, engineering, and medical schools, both from France and from abroad.

== Notable alumni ==
=== Business ===
- Delphine Arnault, CEO and Chairman of Dior
- Laurent Freixe, former CEO of Nestlé
- Michael Burke, CEO of LVMH Fashion Group, former CEO of Bulgari, Louis Vuitton, and Fendi
- Sophie Bellon, CEO and Chairman of Sodexo
- Christophe Bonduelle, CEO and Chairman of Bonduelle
- Marie Guillemot, CEO of KPMG France
- Christian Meunier, Chairman of Nissan Americas, former CEO of Jeep
- Marlène Dolveck, Executive Vice President at CMA CGM, former CEO of SNCF Gares & Connexions
- Virginie Courtin, managing director of Clarins
- Philippe Léopold-Metzger, former CEO of Piaget SA and Cartier (UK and Asia Pacific)
- Christian Polge, former CEO of Coca-Cola France and Canada
- Brigitte Cantaloube, former CEO of Yahoo! France
- Julie Chapon, CEO and co-founder of Yuka
- Michel Guillemot, founder of Gameloft, co-founder of Ubisoft

=== Politics ===
- Daniel Kablan Duncan, former vice president and Prime Minister of Côte d'Ivoire
- Laurent Saint-Martin, Minister delegate for Foreign Trade and French Living Abroad
- Éric Doligé, French politician
- Pierre-Jean Verzelen, French politician
- David Belliard, French politician
- Julien Anfruns, former Director General of the International Council of Museums (ICOM) and judge of the French Supreme Court (Conseil d'État)
- Thierry Mathou, French Ambassador to India, former Director General for Asia and Oceania at the Ministry of Europe and Foreign Affairs
- Anne de Bayser, former Deputy Chief of Staff of the French Presidency

=== Others ===
- Yves Navarre, French writer and founder of the Syndicat des écrivains de langue française (Union of French-speaking Writers)
- Jean-Jacques Goldman, French singer
- Manon Brunet, Olympic medalist in fencing
- Count Alexandre de Lur Saluces, viticulturist and managing director of Château d'Yquem
- Charlotte Dauphin, French filmmaker
- Michaël Boumendil, French composer
