= EDHEC Sailing Cup =

Intercollegiate sporting event in Europe

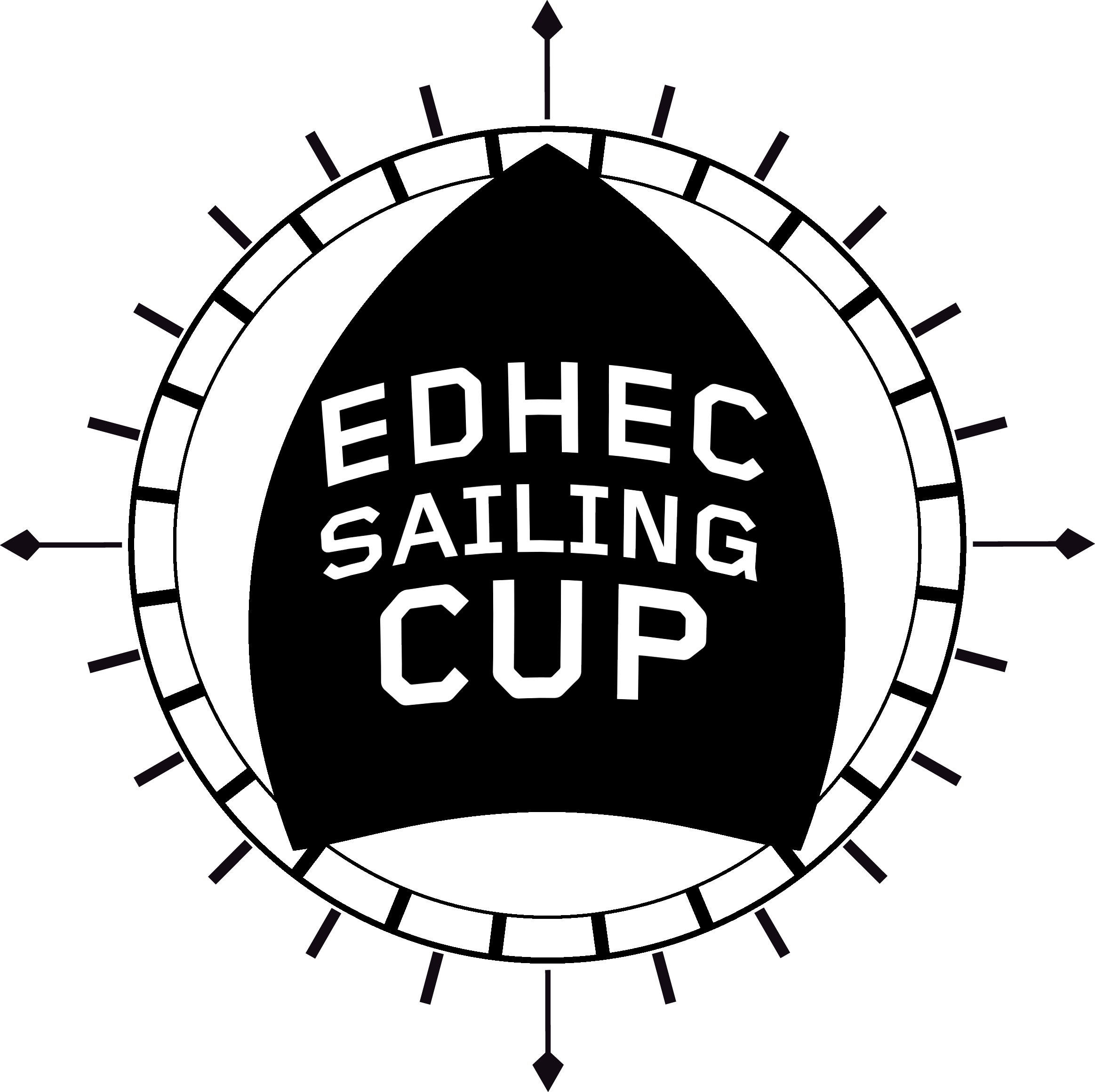
- EDHEC Sailing Cup logo.

History
- Sport: Sail, adventure racing, beach sports
- Established: 1969
- Organizer: EDHEC Sailing Cup association
- Edition: 52nd edition in 2020
- Headquarters: Lille, France
- Sponsors: Lidl, Orange, Xerox, Ernst & Young, La Banque postale, CMA-CGM, Marine Nationale

Current Race
- Start: Port Olona - Les Sables-d'Olonne, France: 12.04.2024
- Finish: Port Olona - Les Sables-d'Olonne, France: 21.04.2024
- Entries: 3,200 (overall)
- Yachts Used: One-Design division: Grand Surprise, Longtze and J/80; IRC division: monohull boats with a length overall from 8 m to 16 m and a rating between 14 and 33.5 net handicap
- Websites: www.cce.fr/en/

The EDHEC Sailing Cup (« ESC ») (Course Croisière EDHEC or « CCE » in French) is the leading student sporting event in Europe and the world's biggest intercollegiate offshore regatta. It takes place every year in a French harbour of the Atlantic Ocean. First held in 1969, nowadays it gathers 3,200 participants coming from 23 countries and from more than 165 universities. In 2017, the association received the award of the best student organization in France by the ANEO challenge.

Today the ESC is composed of three different trophies that include diverse sports: The Sea Trophy (a regatta), the Land Trophy (a multi-sport raid), and the Sand Trophy (a beach soccer, beach rugby, and beach volley competition).

== History ==
Three French students from the prestigious EDHEC Business School willing to broaden the sport of sailing, Jean-Luc Picot, Francis Prat, and Pierre Jouannet, decided in 1968 to organize a student regatta. It took place from May 1 to May 4, 1969, in Dunkirk. For its first edition, the then-called EDHEC Business School Cup, gathered 18 crews and was won by a Dutch team. Older than the Vendée Globe, the Volvo Ocean Race and another sailing event, the EDHEC Sailing Cup constitutes a precursor in the high-level competitions.

Seven years after its creation the regatta reached 100 crews from 10 nationalities and took its actual name, the "EDHEC Sailing Cup". 329 boats attended the 18th edition, a record. For the 19th edition the Organizing Team decided to build a Village to welcome participants, partners and activities in one place. The same year the "Chaîne Avitaillement", an open-air free supermarket, was also created. For its 23rd edition, 20 international boats participated in the regatta including the first African boat, from Tunisia, and boats from the United States and from Brazil. In 1994 was created the Land Trophy. It was first created as a replacement of the Sea Trophy. Since it was a great success, it became a full trophy. In 1998 an Israeli-Palestinian team participated in the regatta – it was the ancestor of the "Peace Boat." 6,000 participants attend to the EDHEC Sailing Cup in Brest. In 1999, the EDHEC Sailing Cup became the leading student sporting event in Europe.

To give a more sporting dimension to the event, the Sand Trophy was created in 2007. For the first time in 2010 was organized the Orange Port of Call, a coastal race that gathers the participants, at night, in an area away from the Village under a marquee build up for the occasion. In 2013, the EDHEC Sailing Cup and the Intercollegiate Offshore Regatta, organized by Storm Trysail Foundation and Larchmont Yacht Club, created a partnership. It enables the winners of each regatta to have their costs of participation for the other one covered.

Among the renowned sailors who have participated at least once in the event are Eric Tabarly, Alain Colas, Franck Cammas, Olivier de Kersauson, Vincent Riou, Jean Le Cam, Marc Thiercelin, Yves Parlier, Marc Pajot, Yann Eliès, Yvan Bourgnon, Jean-Luc Van Den Heede and Jimmy Pahun.

== The Sea Trophy ==
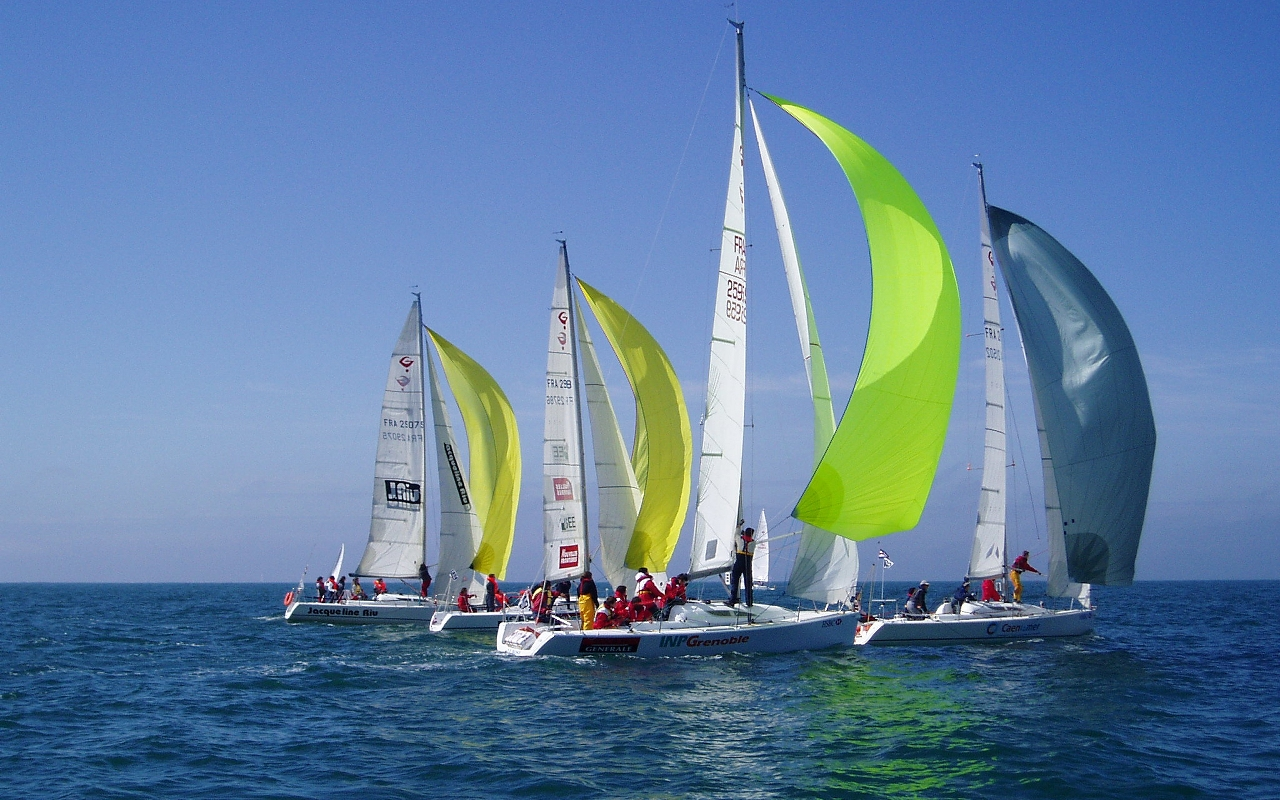
Grand Surprise boats at race during the 37th Edition in Les Sables d'Olonne.

The Sea Trophy, created in 1969, is the historic heart of the EDHEC Sailing Cup and remains the biggest trophy of the EDHEC Sailing Cup. Each year, the competition gathers more than 230 boats. The French Federation of Sailing (FFVoile) and its National Race Committee supervise the race. It is open to all monohull boats with a length overall between 8 and 16 meters (approximately 25 to 50 feet) with a rating of 14 to 33.5 net handicap as well as Longtze boats. The three common boats used are Grand Surprise (around 40 boats), J/80 (around 40 boats) and Longtze (around 10 boats). The competition is divided in several rankings: An Overall Ranking, a 100% Student and the 100% International, and each competition is rewarded by different prizes. The results of the EDHEC Sailing Cup are used in order to choose which French team will be selected for the Student Yachting World Cup.

== The other trophies ==
=== The Land Trophy ===
The Land Trophy was created in 1994. More than 150 teams of four or five are competing in several sports such as mountain bike, running, orienteering, canoeing, zip-line or abseiling. In 2017, an obstacle course was organized between participants of the Land Trophy and of The Sand Trophy: The Mud Contest.

=== The Sand Trophy ===
Created in 2007, this trophy is divided in more than 80 teams of 5 to 9 individuals. There are competitions of beach soccer, beach rugby and beach volleyball during the day and concerts in the evening. The competitors spend all of their time on the Village with their teammates and other teams. They can rent a stand of 16m2 to represent their school and their sponsors and organize activities in it such as fast-food contest or a petanque tournament.

In 2017, the Sand Trophy evolved for its 10th edition. The day is divided into two parts. One part is for classical sporting challenges and the other for more various challenges with, for example, an escape game, an archer arena and a nautic trophy.

=== The Air Trophy ===
The latest Trophy, which last took place in 2016, was a competition of kitesurfing and windsurfing. Initiated in Lorient in 2011 and officially launched in 2012 during the 44th edition, the trophy was the first kitesurfing competition in teams ever organized in France. The windsurfing competition was divided into two different elements: A race and a freestyle contest. The kitesurfing was divided into a race, a freestyle and a boarder cross contest.

== The Organizing Team ==
The EDHEC Sailing Cup is an event organized by students for students. Indeed, the entire event is organized by students, from the logistic to the communication of the event and its 3 trophies. Divided into four divisions - Logistic, Sports, External Relations and Communication - with a head office, the association works likes a real SME, with presidents that devote their whole gap year to this mission.
