= Julien Anfruns =

French business executive

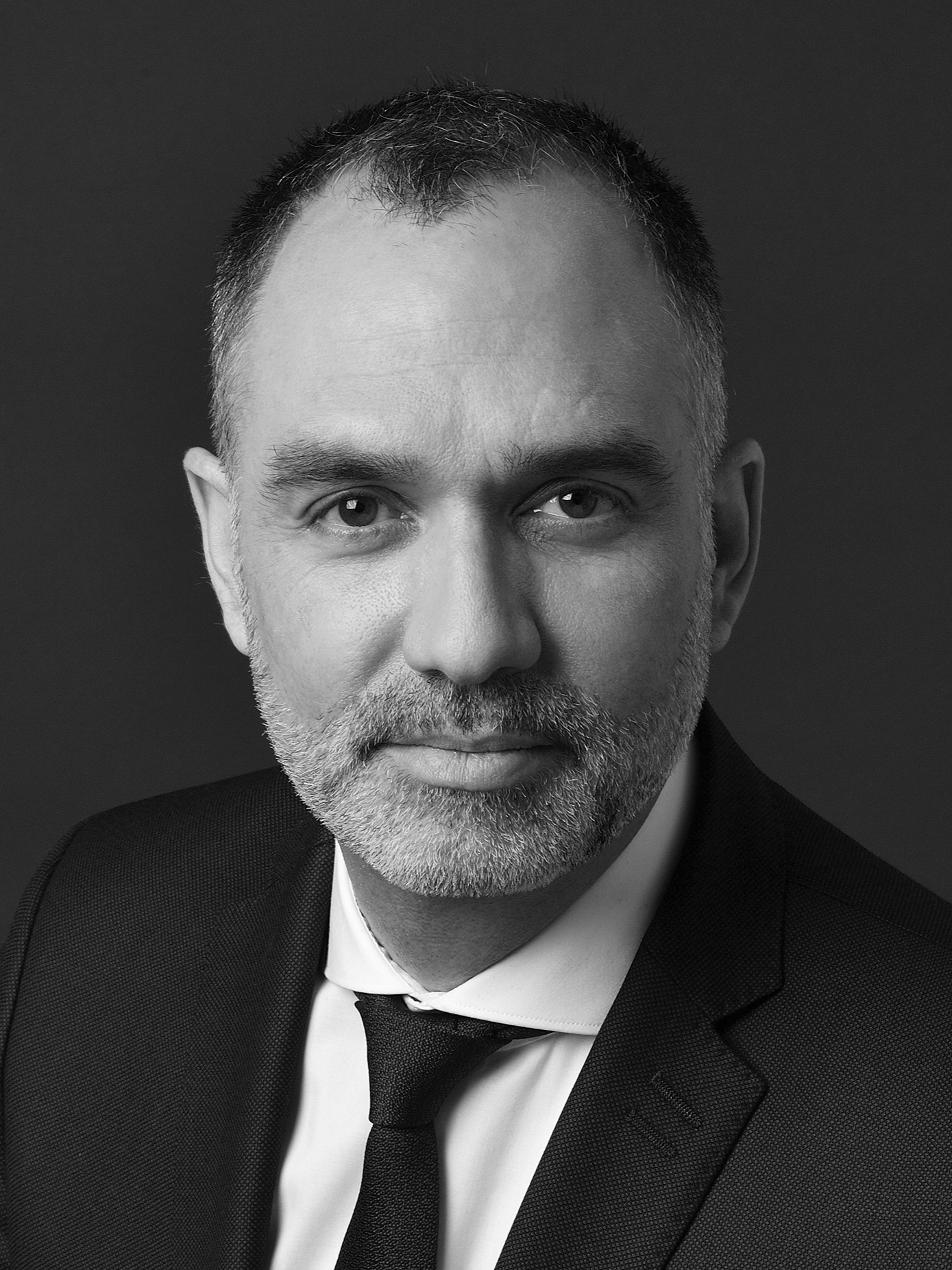
- Occupation(s): Senior Civil Servant, Member of the Council of State (France), Lawyer
- Website: French Conseil d’Etat - Official website

Julien Anfruns is a French lawyer and a French business executive. Formerly, he was the director of corporate affairs for Philip Morris, France, and a member of the Executive Committee. He also served as a French senior civil servant, and was nominated in September 2013 to serve as a member of the Council of State (Conseil d’Etat) as a supreme court judge.

From 2008, Julien Anfruns was the director general of the International Council of Museums (ICOM) until his dismissal in May 2013. On the occasion of the 2010 World Expo (Expo 2010) in Shanghai, China, ICOM held its 22nd General Conference between 7 and 12 November, during which Julien Anfruns welcomed, among others, former French president Jacques Chirac, as well as former Mali president Alpha Oumar Konaré.

In September 2013, as a member of the French Council of State he was both specialized in tax and economics laws in the ninth chamber and advising the government on defense and civil service as rapporteur for bills and decrees.

Julien Anfruns was educated at the National School of Administration (École nationale d'administration, ENA) and EDHEC Business School. He was the director of administration, for financial and legal affairs (C.F.O. and general counsel) at the Louvre Museum (Musée du Louvre) between 2005 and 2008, where he was involved in the strategic development of the Louvre both in France and abroad, notably for the project Louvre Abu Dhabi. He has also previously occupied several diplomatic posts including at the United Nations in New York, as well as in Finland and Estonia.

He is also actively involved as a member of several think tank groups, including the Global Agenda Council on the Role of the Arts in Society for the World Economic Forum (Davos). In April 2013, he was nominated as a member to the French national commission of the European Heritage Label.

Julien Anfruns also engages in forums bringing together culture and business and participates on panels such as the Forum d'Avignon and is a member of the Nouveau Club de Paris, which supports knowledge economy. He served as a trustee for the European Museum Forum between January 2010 and February 2013. He is a member of the Advisory Board of EDHEC Business School.

== International Committee of the Blue Shield (ICBS) ==
Following the Second World War, UNESCO adopted the Hague Convention (1954), creating rules to protect cultural goods during armed conflicts. This convention was the first international treaty aimed at protecting cultural heritage in the context of war and which highlighted the concept of common heritage. The International Committee of the Blue Shield (ICBS) is stated in the protocol of the Hague Convention and was created as the equivalent for heritage of what the International Committee of the Red Cross (ICRC) represents for humanitarian actions. ICBS incorporated museums and archives, audiovisual supports, libraries, and monuments and sites. It brings together the knowledge, experience and international networks of the following non-governmental organisations dealing with cultural heritage: ICA, International Council on Archives; ICOM, International Council of Museums; IFLA, International Federation of Library Associations and Institutions; ICOMOS, International Council on Monuments and Sites; and CCAAA, Coordinating Council of Audiovisual Archives Associations. Julien Anfruns was president of the International Committee of the Blue Shield (ICBS) between 2009 and 2013. In 2016, ICBS amalgamated with the Association of National Committees of the Blue Shield (ANCBS) to become The Blue Shield.

== Conferences and contributions ==
Julien Anfruns is invited to participate at many conferences and contributes on numerous to several international projects. His most recent contributions:

- Rencontres économiques d'Aix-en-Provence, "What place for companies in transformation of society?" (7 July 2018)
- International conference in Tunis on the status of Judges (29-30 March 2017), European Commission, programme TAIEX
- International Legal Symposium in Indonesia with the United Nations Development Program, the EU Sustain Program and the Indonesian Judicial Commission, Jakarta (9-11 November 2016)
- World Economic Forum, Summit on the Global Agenda, Abu Dhabi, United Arab Emirates (18–20 November 2013)
- Conference on Intangible Heritage and Territories Attraction, French Ministry of Finance, Paris, 17 October 2013
- World Economic Forum (Davos, Switzerland) from du 23 to 27 January 2013
- First Congress of the northern committees of the ICOM Latin America and Caribbean Alliance in Guatemala (10–12 December 2012)
- Forum d'Avignon (France) from 15 to 17 November 2012
- Summit of the World Economic Forum in Dubai, United Arab Emirates (12–14 November 2012)
- Annual Conference of NEMO (Network of European Museum Organisations) in Dublin, Ireland from 2 to 4 November 2012
- Symposium for the French-speaking Sub-Saharian area’s heritage (Paris, 26 October 2012)
- AVICOM Conference (International Committee for Audiovisual and New Image and Sound Technologies in Museums) in Montreal, Quebec, Canada from 9 to 11 October 2012
- The Best in Heritage Conference in Dubrovnik, Croatia, from 27 to 29 September 2012
- ICOMOS and ICAHM Regional Conference in Greece about heritage protection in times of economic crisis (23–25 May 2012)
- The IBA Art, Cultural institutions and Heritage Law Committee’s conference about "New Art: New Legal Challenges" at the MAXXI (Roma, 17–18 May 2012)
- The 2012 Council of Europe Museum Prize at a Ceremony held in Strasbourg on 25 April 2012
- The International Fair of Agriculture for the conference of museums of agriculture on 2 March 2012
- The Irish Museums Association’s conference on 25 February 2012
- Jury of the contest entitled Musées (em)portables in Paris in January 2012
- First International Conference of ICBS in Seoul in December 2011
- International Bar Association (IBA) Annual Conference in Dubai in October 2011
- The Best in Heritage Excellence Club at EXPONATEC COLOGNE in November 2011

== Bibliography ==
- Morozov et la boîte de Pandore, Le Journal du Dimanche, 13/03/2022
- L'idéologie ne doit pas guider les restitutions d'oeuvres d'art, L'Opinion, 11/01/2021
- Les églises de France recueillent des trésors du patrimoine dont nous avons tous la responsabilité, La Croix, 26/08/2020
- Le soft power, un atout exceptionnel pour la France, Le Cercle Les Echos, 17/04/2018
- Les Musées sont-ils les ambassadeurs de nos sociétés, in Histoire d'une Passion, Luxembourg Museum's Friends ans Julien Anfruns (co-author), 2017 ISBN 978-99959-0-328-2
- Patrimoine culturel et conflits armés, Julien Anfruns, Encyclopédia Universalis, 201536
- Art Collecting Legal Handbook, Préface Julien Anfruns, Bruno Boesch et Massimo Sterpi (editors), 2013, ISBN 978-0414026933
- Julien Anfruns: The Best in Heritage 2012 Publication, Julien Anfruns’ keynote speech Ethics for the heritage sector, Web
- André Desvallées, François Mairesse: Dictionnaire encyclopédique de muséologie, Préface Julien Anfruns, Armand Colin, 2011, ISBN 978-2200270377
- Capital immatériel et middle market, Julien Anfruns, Didier Dumont et Dominique Latrilhe, DFGC, Deloitte, 2008 ISSN 1950-0033
