= Virginie Courtin =

French businesswoman

- Born: June 1985 (age 41)
- Education: EDHEC Business School
- Occupation: Businesswoman
- Title: Managing Director of Clarins
- Term: 2023–present

Virginie Courtin is a French businesswoman and the managing director of Clarins. She represents the third generation of the Courtin family to lead the company founded by her grandfather, Jacques Courtin.

== Biography ==
=== Education and personal life ===
Virginie Courtin was born in France in 1985. She is the daughter of Christian Courtin, chairman of the Clarins Group, and granddaughter of Jacques Courtin, the company's founder. She studied at EDHEC Business School.

Virginie is one of four Courtin cousins, along with her sister Claire and her cousins Jenna and Prisca (twin daughters of Olivier Courtin), who have received media attention for their association with the Clarins brand and their presence at major fashion events.

=== Professional career ===
Virginie Courtin held many positions at Clarins. In 2013, Virginie Courtin took on the role of marketing director at the fashion brand Mugler, which was then part of the Clarins Group.

In 2020, she was appointed Deputy CEO and Chief CSR Officer of Clarins. She implemented packaging and supply chain reforms, favoring eco-responsible methods.

In September 2023, she was appointed managing director of Clarins, in a generational transition at the head of the company.
