= Camille Lefèvre =

French sculptor

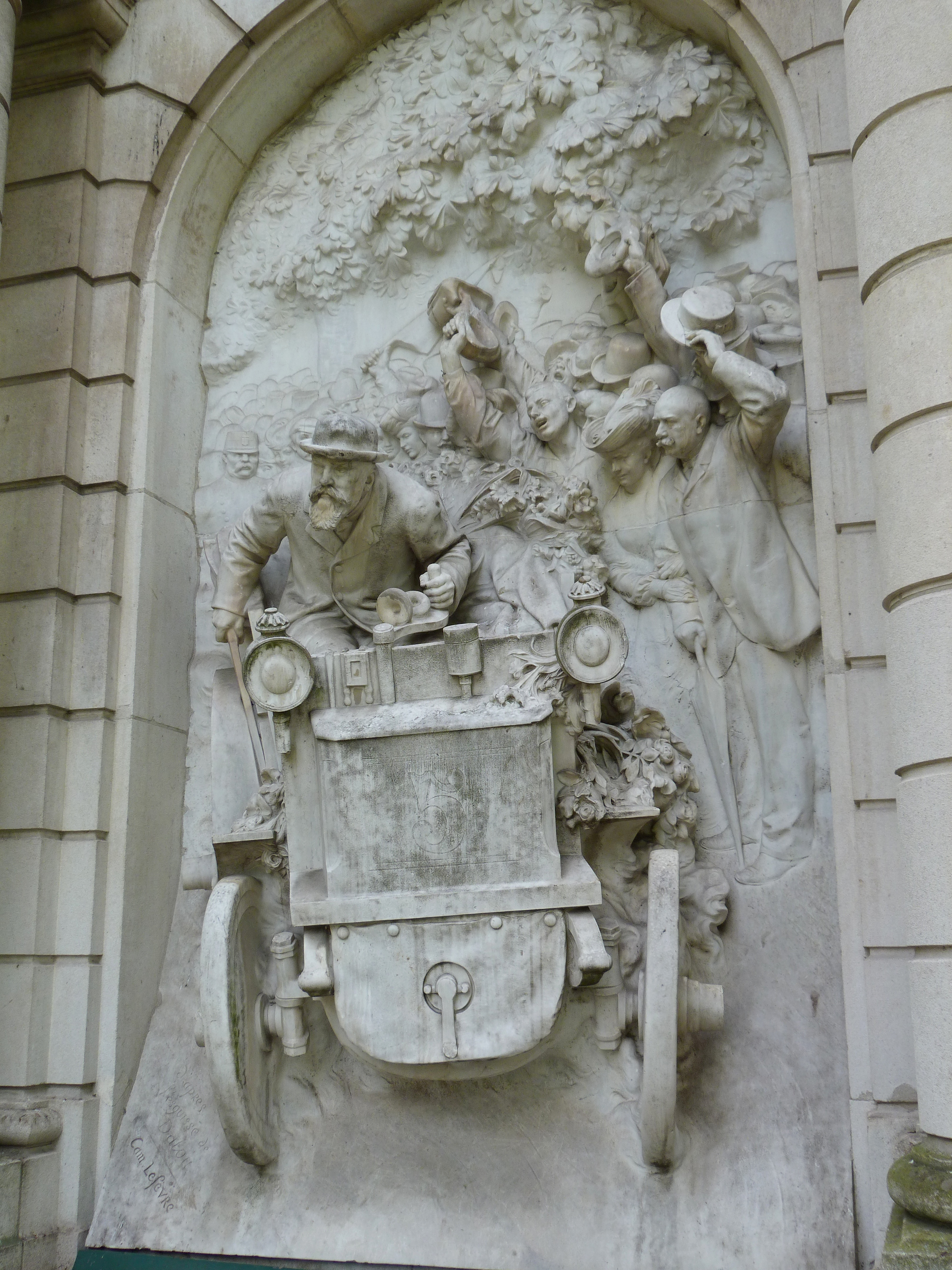
Monument to Émile Levassor, 1907

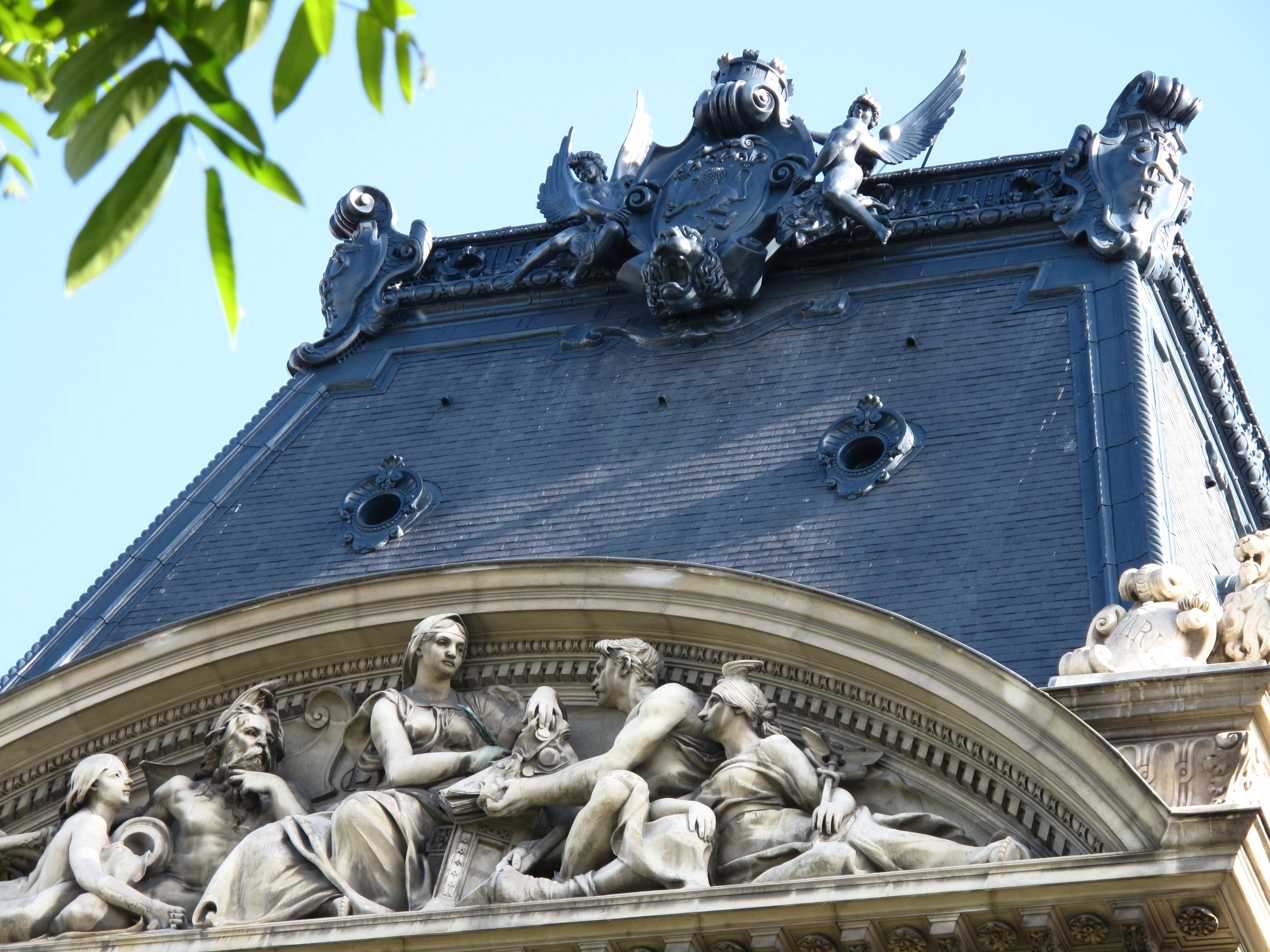
pediment, Crédit Lyonnais headquarters, Paris

Camille Lefèvre (French pronunciation: [kamij ləfɛvʁ]; 1853–1933) was a French sculptor and architect.

== Biography ==
Born in Issy-les-Moulineaux, in 1870 Lefèvre became a pupil of Jules Cavelier at the École nationale supérieure des Beaux-Arts in Paris.

In 1877 and 1878, he won the second Prix de Rome in sculpture. He also won Grande Médaille d’Émulation from the École des Beaux-Arts in 1877. In 1893, he exhibited at the Chicago World Fair. In 1900, he became a member of the New Society of Painters and Sculptors and is made a Knight of the Legion of Honour in 1901.

From 1903 to 1906 he was professor at the National School of Decorative Arts. He was also the student of Jules Dalou, and Lefèvre completed a Greco-Roman-style triumphal arch in 1907, after Dalou's death in 1902.

Throughout his career, Lefevre remained concerned with social issues, participating in charitable works and maintaining relations with the middle left-liberal among artists as Eugène Carrière and journalist Jules Lermina. He was a prominent member of the Salon d'Automne, which Carrière was president of.

Among his students was the American sculptor Frederick Ruckstull. At his death, his collections and his studio was bequeathed to the museum of art and history of Belfort. Other works are kept at the Musée d'Orsay and in provincial museums.

== Work ==
- Monument to Emile Levassor in the Square Alexandre-and-René-Parodi
- Pediment of the Crédit Lyonnais headquarters, Paris (1880–1883)
- The Ford, marble (1884), installed in 1942 in the gardens of Sainte-Anne Hospital in Paris
- allegorical figure of Painting (1900), the Grand Palais, Paris
- Triumph of the Republic (1902), Issy-les-Moulineaux
- completion of the Monument to Léon Gambetta (1905), posthumous work of Jules Dalou
- completion of the Monument Levassor (1907), posthumous work of Dalou, at the Porte Maillot in Paris.
- architectural sculpture for the Gare de Rouen-Rive-Droite (1928)

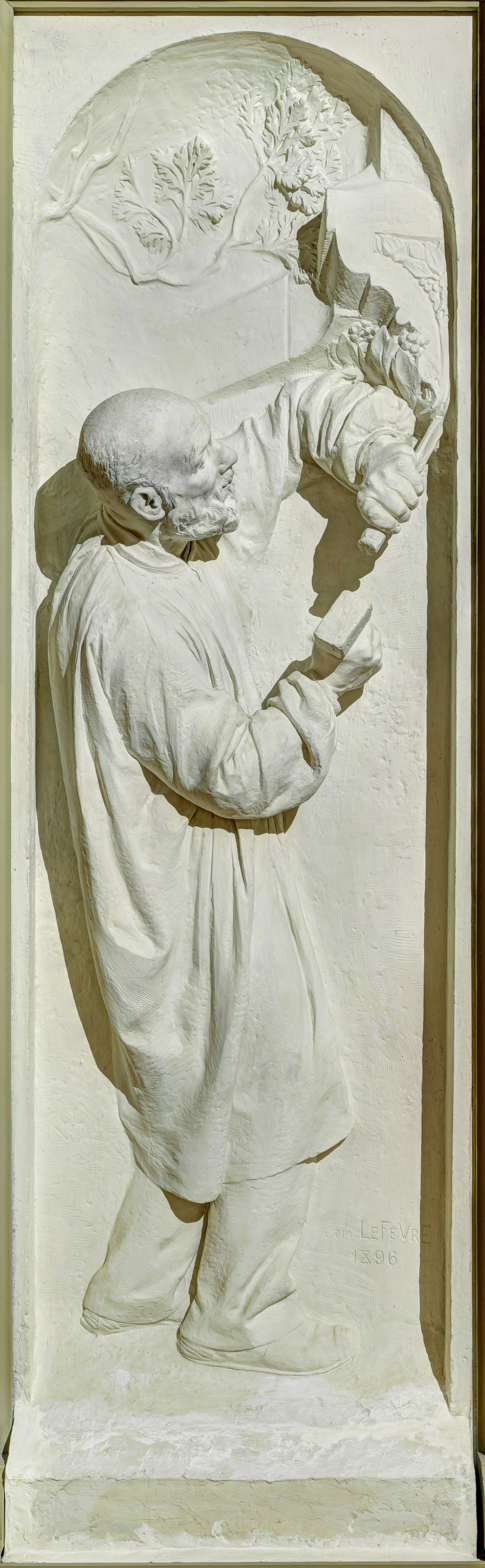
"Le sculpteur". Photo by Thomas Bresson

- This page translated from its French equivalent accessed 4/22/2011
