= Christian Polge =

French businessman

- Born: March 27, 1965 (age 61); France
- Citizenship: French
- Education: EDHEC Business School, INSEAD
- Occupation: Businessman
- Known for: Former CEO of Coca-Cola France and Canada
- Children: 3

Christian Polge (born March 27, 1965) is a French businessman who has worked as CEO of Coca-Cola France and Canada.

== Early years and education ==
Christian Polge was born on March 27, 1965. He graduated from EDHEC Business School and INSEAD.

== Career ==
After graduating from EDHEC Business School, he received a job offer from the Société Parisienne de Boissons Gazeuses, then a subsidiary of Pernod Ricard. The company was subsequently acquired by the Coca-Cola Company. He started as a sales representative, later becoming a sales manager for large retailers, regional manager for vending operations, and national key accounts manager.

In 1994, he was promoted to National Director of the retail channel, and then became Regional Director for the Paris Île-de-France region.

From 2002 to 2005, he served as Vice President and Director of Sales and Marketing for Coca-Cola Enterprises. After several years on the board of directors, he was appointed President of the Institut Français du Merchandising (French Institute of Merchandising) in 2005, succeeding Serge Papin of Coopérative U.

From 2005 to 2010, he was CEO of Coca-Cola France, the French subsidiary of the Coca-Cola Company. He was responsible for growth strategy, brand marketing, communication, and partnerships. He succeeded Paul Gordon, who was appointed European Strategy Director. During his tenure, Coca-Cola re-entered the bottled water market. He doubled Coca-Cola’s advertising budget and oversaw the launch of Coca-Cola Zero in 2007. In 2009, he became President of the Syndicat national des boissons rafraîchissantes (National Union of Refreshing Beverages), which gathers the main soft drink manufacturers in France. In 2015, he was named President of Coca-Cola Canada and joined the Executive Committee of Coca-Cola North America. In 2018, he took over as CEO of the herbal tea brand Les Deux Marmottes, based in Savoie, France.

== Personal life ==
He is the father of three children.
