= Brigitte Cantaloube =

French businesswoman

- Born: June 13, 1967 (age 59)
- Education: EDHEC Business School
- Occupation: Businesswoman
- Board member of: Rexel

Brigitte Cantaloube (born July 13, 1967) is a French businesswoman. She is chairperson of the compensation committee at Rexel and was formerly CEO of Yahoo! France and Chief Digital Officer at PSA Group.

== Biography ==
After graduating from EDHEC Business School, Brigitte Cantaloube began her career with the Expansion media group in 1992, initially working as a Sales Executive before advancing to Sales Director. In 2000, she took on the role of Partnerships and marketing director for the group's internet subsidiary. By 2002, she was appointed to Sales Director of the French weekly magazine L’Express.

In 2009, she became CEO of Yahoo! France. The group was going through a difficult period with a significant decline in revenue, forcing it to reduce costs. Shortly after taking on her new role, she oversaw a restructuring plan affecting around fifty positions and the closure of the French research and development site in Échirolles, which had opened just a year earlier. She established partnerships and attempted to stabilize the business, during the time Marissa Mayer joined the American parent company.

In 2016, she joined PSA Peugeot Citroën as Chief Digital Officer. She left the group on in 2017, and was replaced by Christophe Rauturier. In 2020, she joined Rexel’s Board of Directors.
