= Marie Guillemot =

French businesswoman

- Born: April 1968 (age 58)
- Education: EDHEC Business School, INSEAD
- Occupation: Businesswoman
- Title: CEO of KPMG France
- Term: 2021–present
- Predecessor: Jay Nirsimloo

Marie Guillemot (French: [maʁi ɡijmo]) is a French businesswoman who has been CEO of KPMG France since May 2021.

== Biography ==
Marie Guillemot was born in 1968. She graduated from EDHEC Business School and completed an executive program at INSEAD. Before joining KPMG, she worked in audit and consulting, in sectors such as technology, media, and telecommunications. She joined KPMG in 2005.

In 2016, Guillemot was put in charge of developing KPMG France’s large client market and joined the firm’s executive committee in 2017. On 23 September 2021, she was elected CEO of KPMG France, succeeding Jay Nirsimloo. She also became a member of the Global Board of KPMG International and Chair of the KPMG Foundation. In May 2022, under her tenure, KPMG France adopted the legal status of mission-driven company (entreprise à mission), becoming the first audit and consulting firm in France to do so.

She launched a strategic plan in 2021 aimed at making the Consulting division the firm’s primary business in France.
