= Crédit Lyonnais headquarters =

Coordinates: 48°52′14.95″N 2°20′11.45″E

Hôtel des Italiens
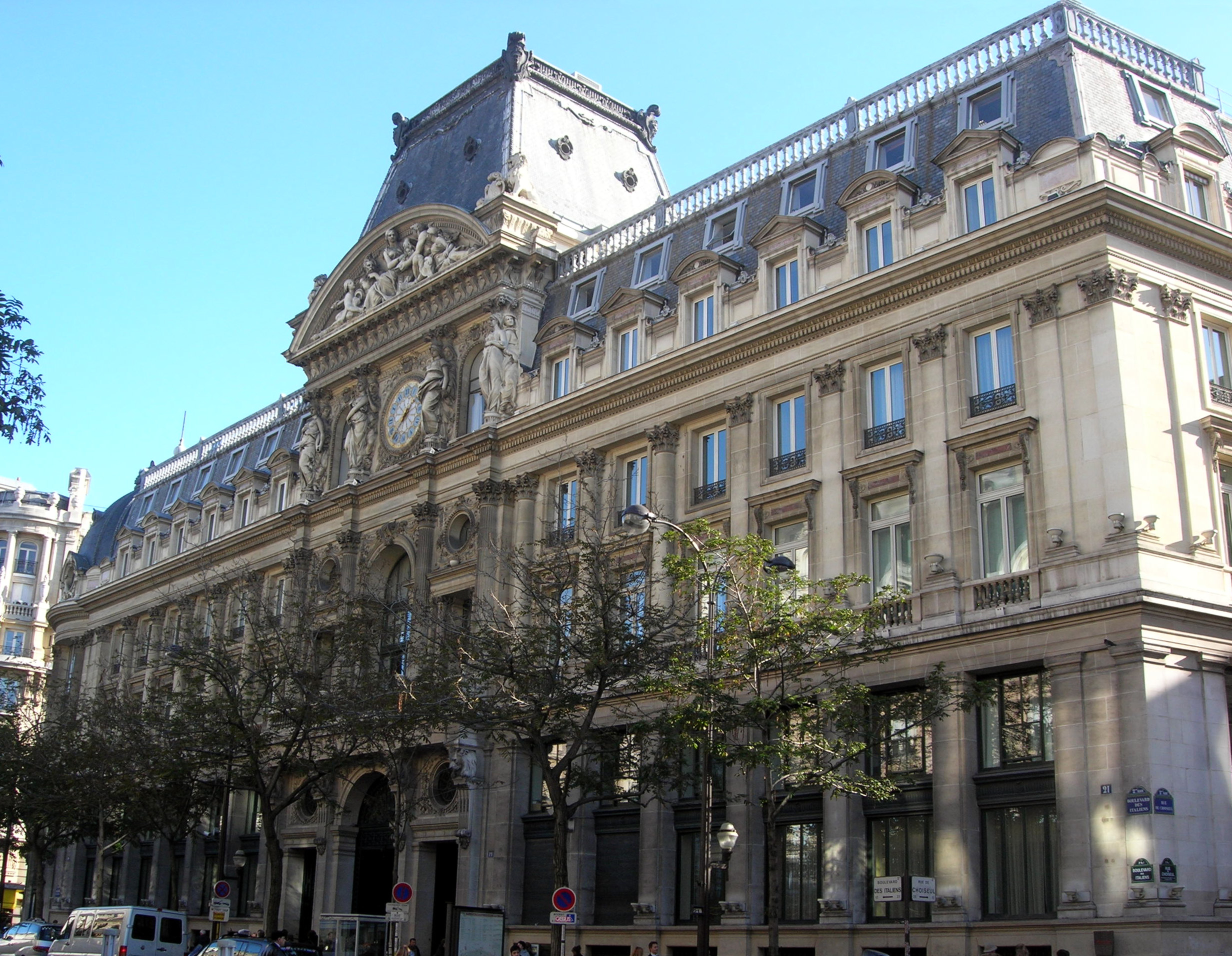
- Interactive map of the Hôtel des Italiens area
- Former names: Crédit Lyonnais headquarters

General information
- Architectural style: Haussmann
- Location: Paris, France, 17–23 Boulevard des Italiens
- Construction started: 1876
- Completed: 1883
- Owner: LCL S.A.

Design and construction
- Architect: William Bouwens van der Boijen

Other information
Public transit access
Located near the Métro stations: Quatre-Septembre and Richelieu – Drouot.

The Crédit Lyonnais headquarters (the headquarters of the French bank Crédit Lyonnais, now LCL) is a Haussmannian style building located in the 2nd arrondissement of Paris. It is on the block formed by Boulevard des Italiens, rue de Gramont, rue du Quatre-Septembre and rue de Choiseul.

Also known as "Hôtel des Italiens", the building is still owned by LCL, although the bank left their historic headquarters in 2010 for new premises in the Parisian suburb of Villejuif, next to the VilleJuif Léo-Lagrange underground station.

== Construction ==
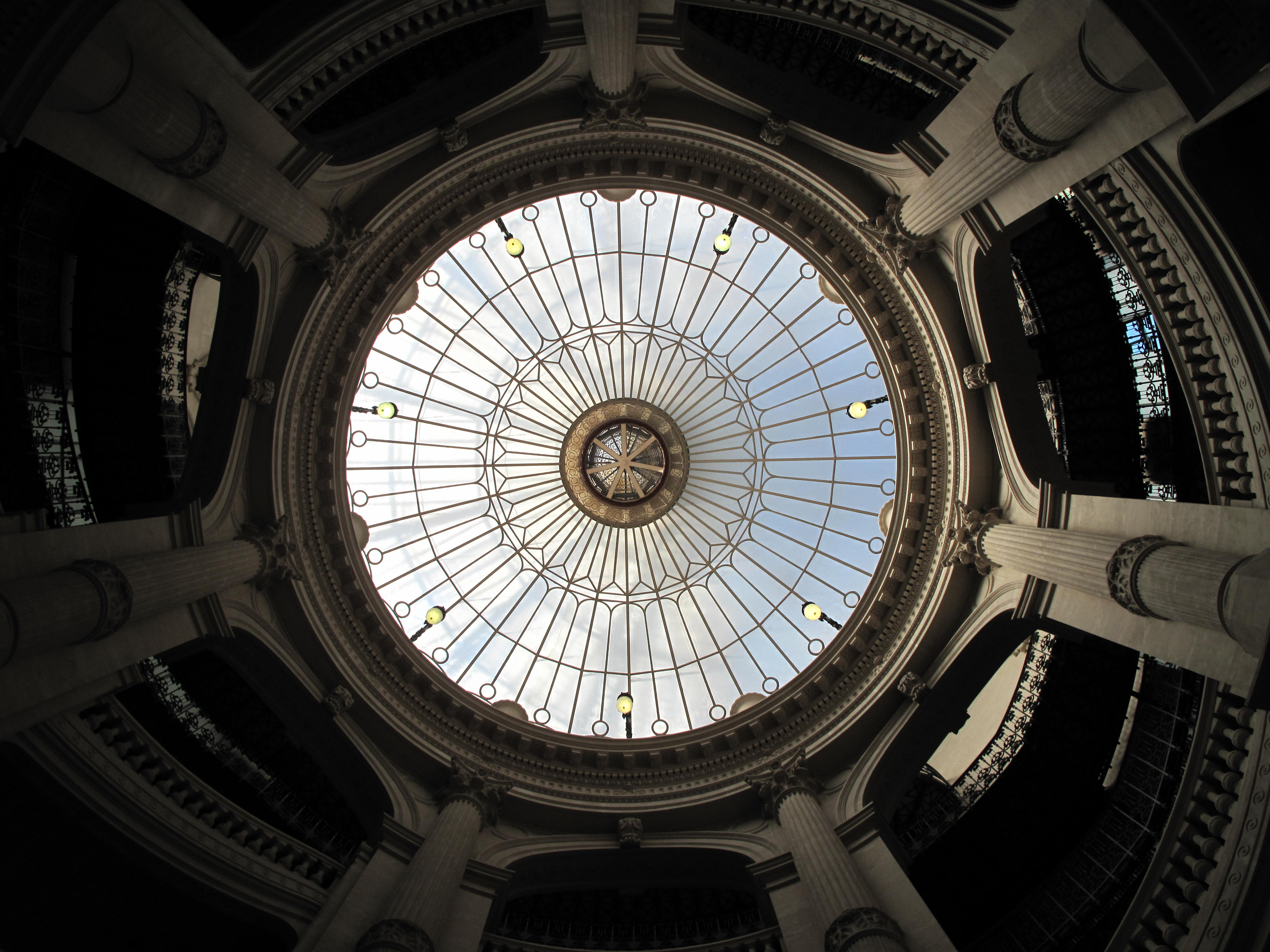
The roof lantern lighting the staircase

- From 1883 to 2010, the headquarters of the Crédit Lyonnais was located on the old Boufflers hotel plot.
- 1876 – 1883: Construction of the main branch in Paris. A block of 1,590 m2 was purchased in Paris. Then, the Boufflers-Rouvenel Hotel was demolished to make way for the headquarters of Crédit Lyonnais, designed by the architect William Bouwens van der Boijen. The building was built in the Haussmannian style to impress customers and investors. The building design was as such so that it could be converted into a department store in case the bank went bankrupt.
- 21 March 1878: The building was inaugurated in the presence of Léon Gambetta, at that time director of the Budget Committee of the National Assembly.

The building is organised around a large double spiral staircase inspired by that of the Château de Chambord. The result lives up to expectations. Crédit Lyonnais even distribute "authorisation to visit" tickets.

- 1882 : Official transfer of Crédit Lyonnais's headquarters from Lyon to Paris.
- 1913: Completion of construction by the architect Victor Laloux. The building was gradually extended to the whole block between the Boulevard des Italiens, the rue de Choiseul, rue du Quatre Septembre and rue de Gramont.

== Building structure ==
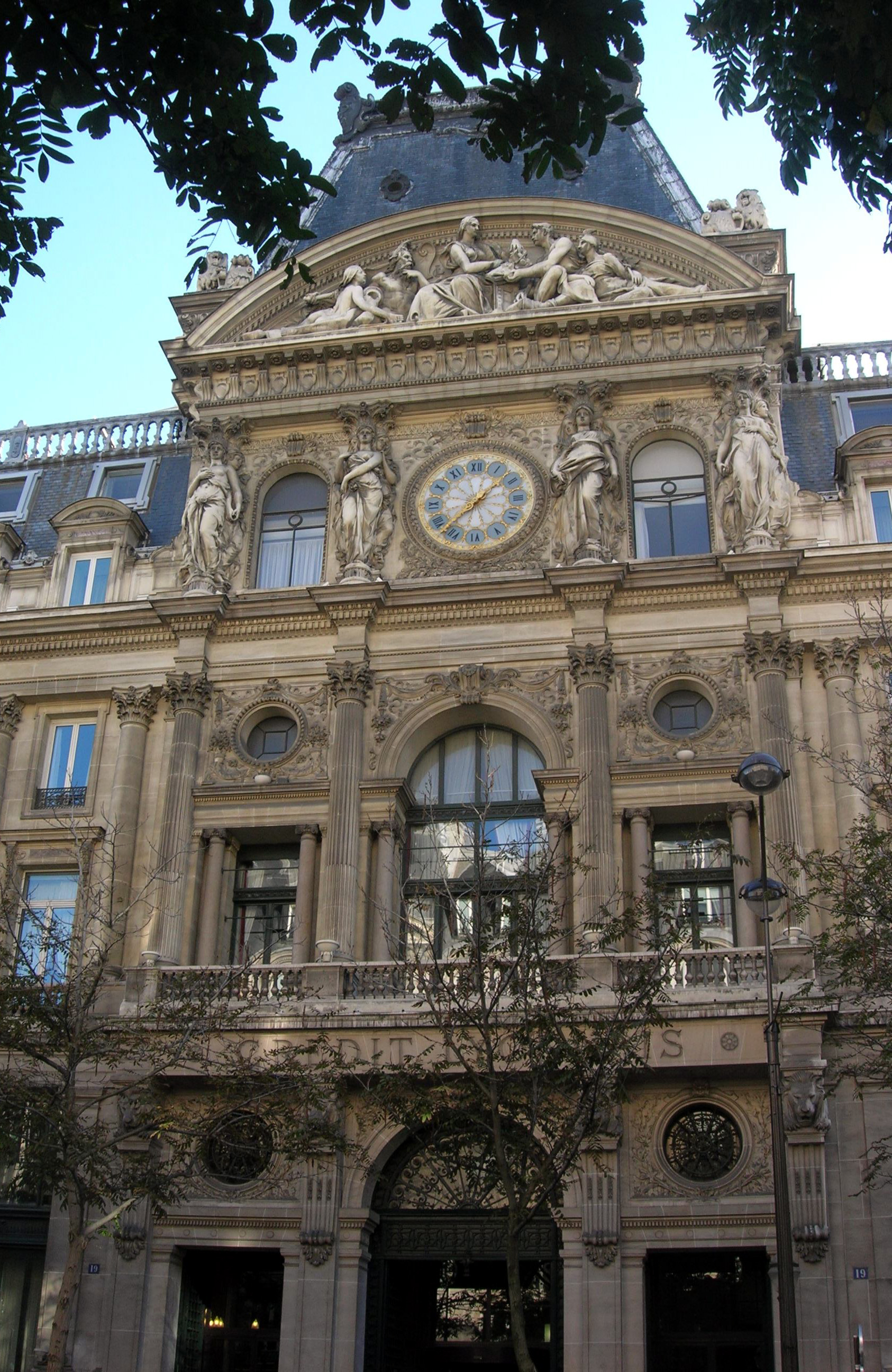
The central pavilion

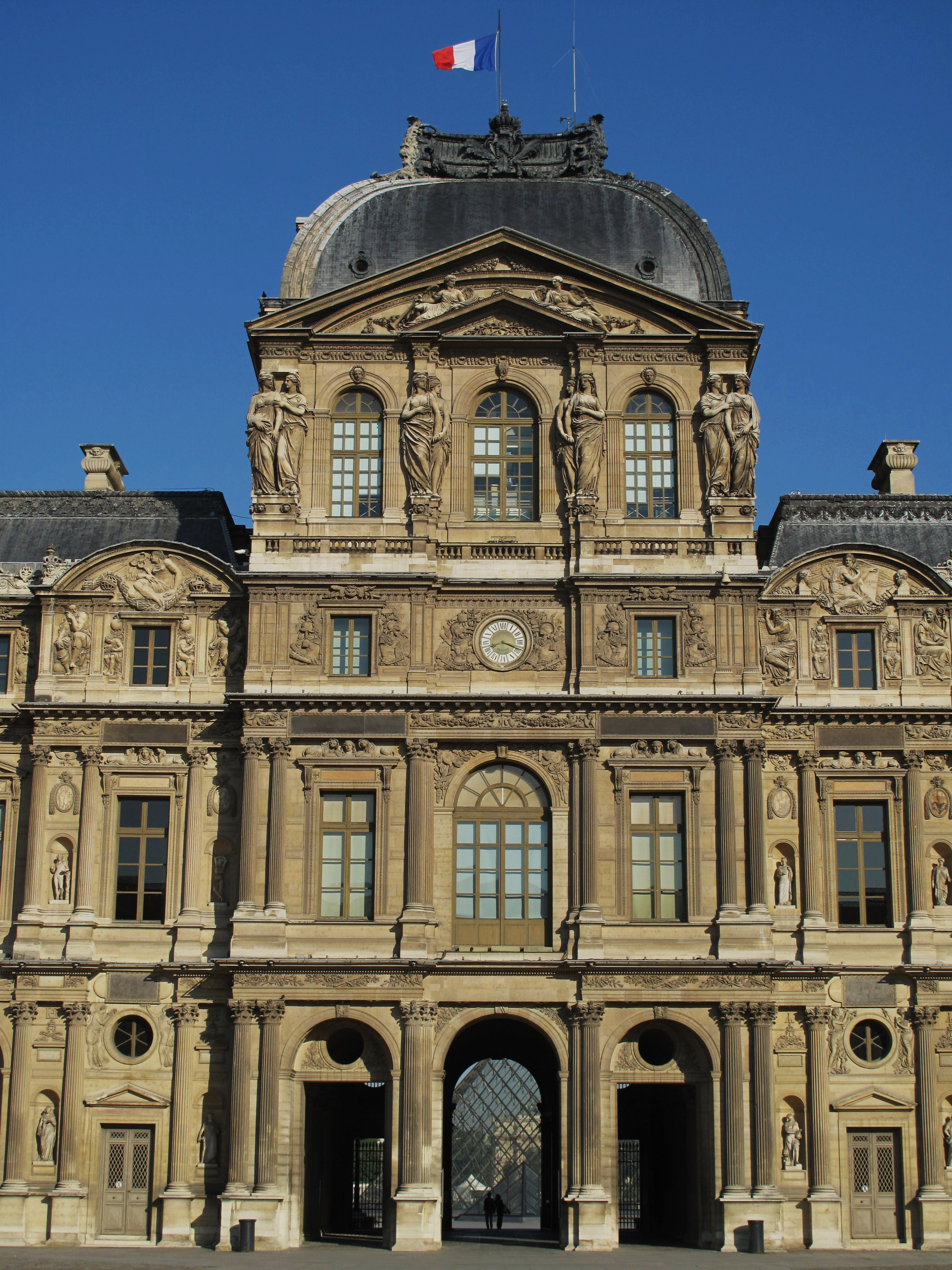
The pavillon de l'Horloge (Palais du Louvre) was the model of the central pavilion

The stone cladding, a traditional symbol of wealth, conceals a metal frame, partially produced by the workshops of Gustave Eiffel.

The office space is split across several floors, on either sides of a gallery that receives light via a glass partition: the entire offices are visible to the public and the management.

At each end of the building is a hall lit by a 21-metre-high (69 ft) window from the workshop of Gustave Eiffel. The windows on the side of the Boulevard des Italiens are more impressive than those on the side of the rue du Quatre-Septembre. The offices of the bank's General Staff are located on the floors here.

The Hall of Securities at the time was designed as a metal framework by Eiffel.

Outside, on the Boulevard des Italiens, the central pavilion is inspired by the pavillon de l’Horloge of the Palais du Louvre. The roof is inspired from the pavillon de Flore. The pavilion has a double serlienne, a group of three bays of which the central bay is the highest with a semicircular arch, while the side bays are covered with a lintel.

The pediment, carved by Camille Lefèvre, is an allegory of banking activities: it represents the bank distributing loans, surrounded by Trade and Industry, and the rivers Rhone and the Seine. It is supported by four groups of caryatids around a large clock by sculptor Désiré-Maurice Ferrary.

When it opened, the building housed one of the first electrical installations. To provide light to the room of safes, part of the floor was composed of glass tiles manufactured by Saint-Gobain. To impress people and encourage them to come in, a huge waiting room, lit by 310 gas burners, opened on to rows of desks in the English fashion, without screens or windows. In the same spirit of open space, the offices were not separated. "Walls are only used by employees to read their newspapers!" said Henri Germain, founder of Crédit Lyonnais. In contrast, management sat on the first floor behind doors with mahogany paneling and draperies of green reps. The securities service moved first from Lyon to Paris. Stocks and bonds were kept in 195 Fichet safes in the basement, surrounded by a walkway and serviced by a staircase at the top where an ashtray is marked "Put out your cigars."

=== The double revolution staircase ===
Inside the building, the Hôtel des Italiens is notable for the double helix or double spiral staircase, inspired by that of the Château de Chambord and with the same objective: to allow two populations to take the same staircase without meeting, one flight (with double balustrade) for the management and the other (single balustrade) for employees.

The staircase requires half a revolution per floor. The flight of management stairs, closest to the entrance to the Boulevard des Italiens, leads to the executives and the council chamber in a revolution (the first half-revolution ends in the mezzanine floor which houses offices around the entrance halls with high ceilings).

In addition, the staircase is asymmetrical, because it has a total of seven spans traversed in a revolution: a horizontal span at the level of a floor, 3 spans of steps on the east side, a horizontal span at the level of a floor, 2 spans of steps on the west side.

The division into steps of the two flights of stairs is different:

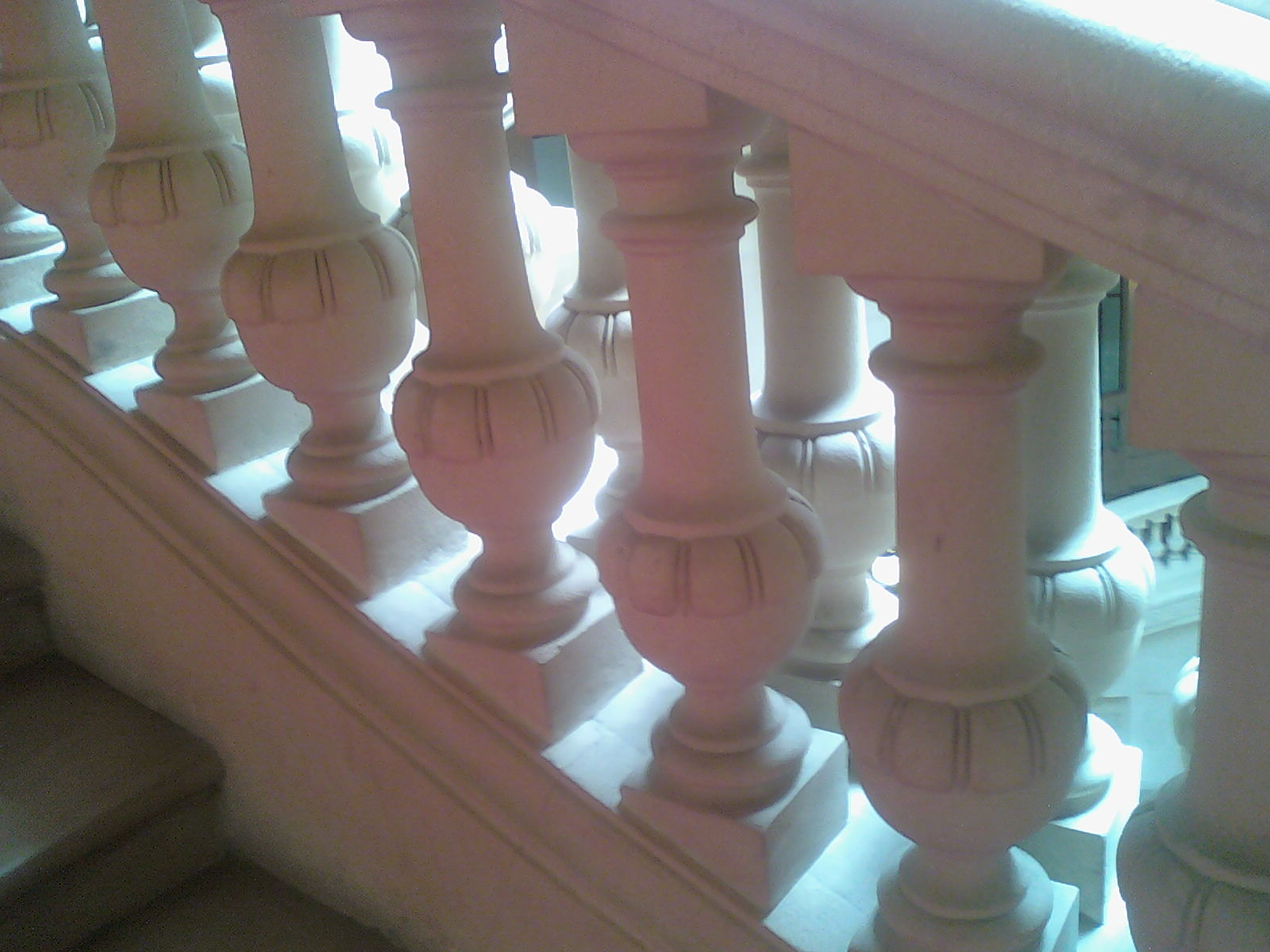
Double balustrade in the stairs for management

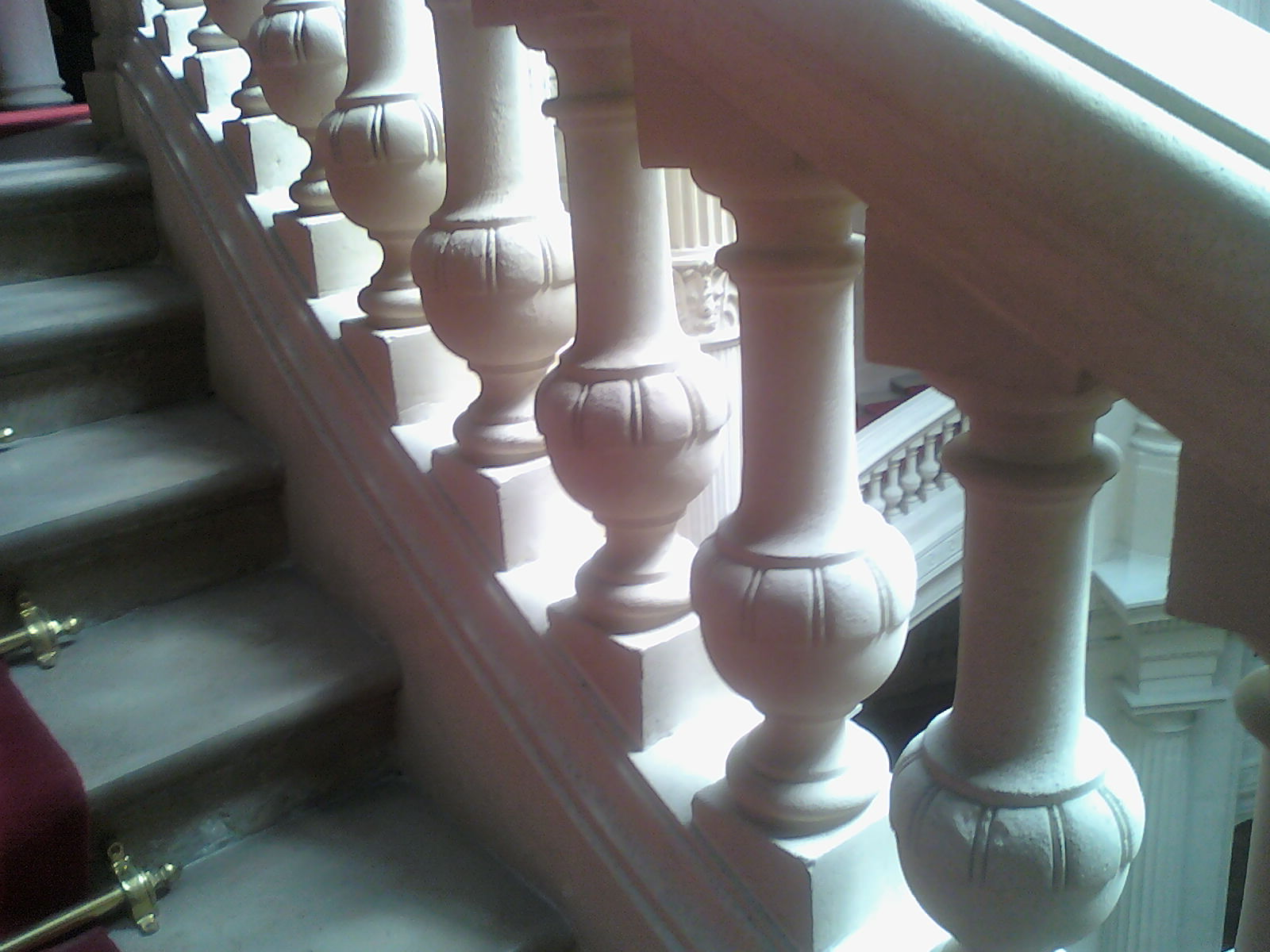
Simple balustrade in the stairs for employees

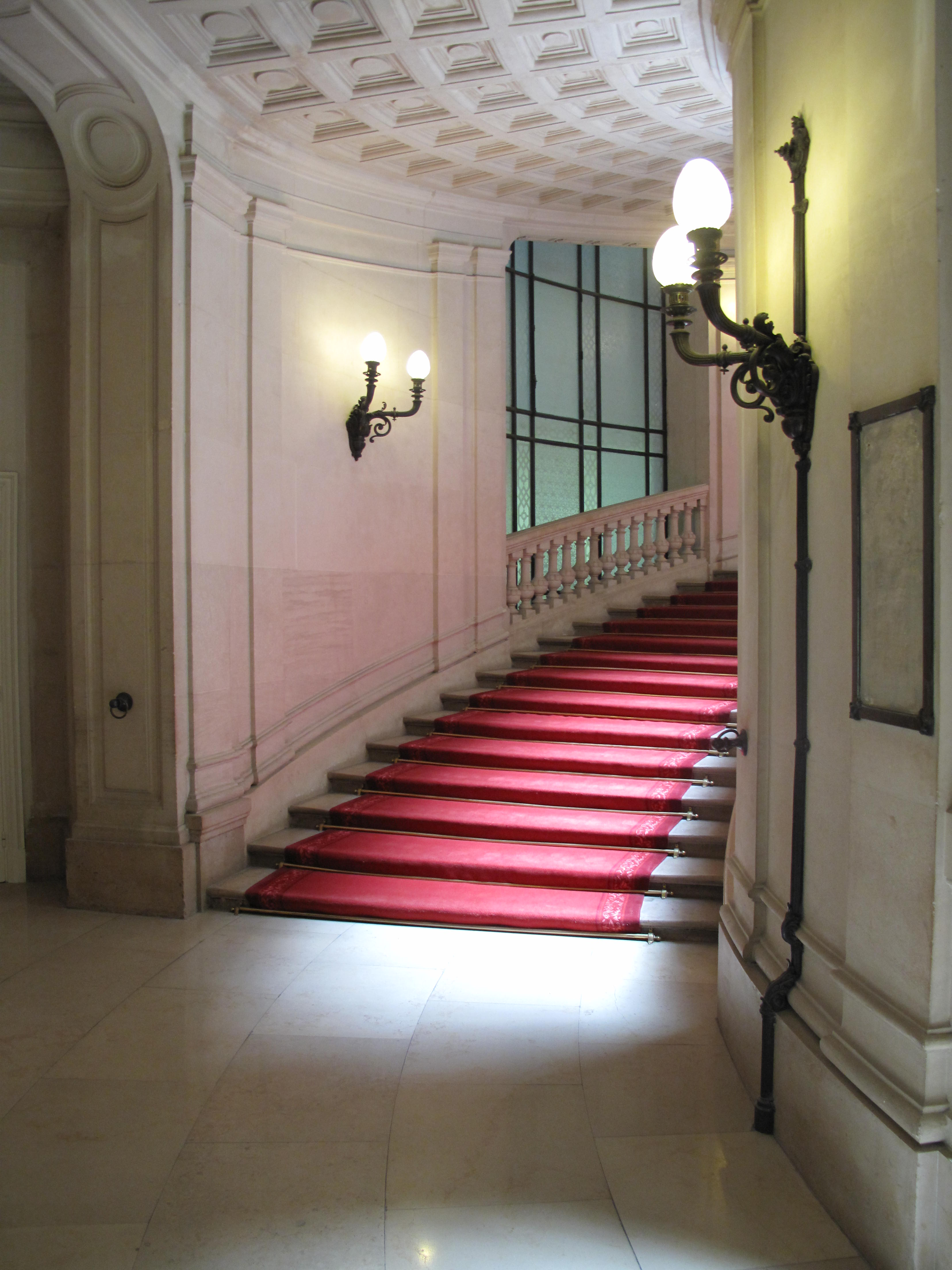
Stairs for management

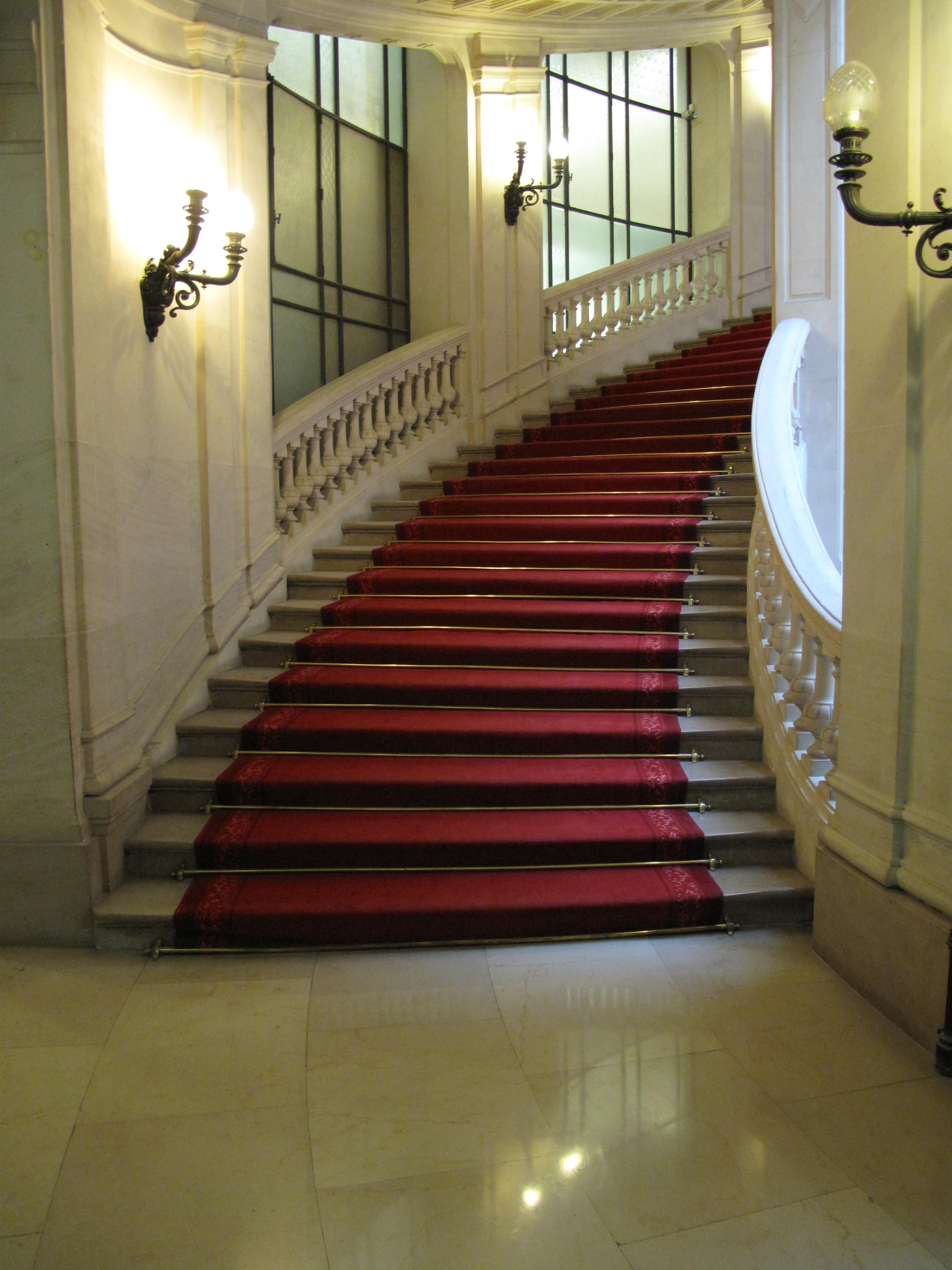
Stairs for employees

The stone staircase continues in the form of a metal staircase from the second floor to the fourth, but always in a double revolution. The use of metal is characteristic of this industrial era. A glass roof, 30 meters above the ground, illuminates the entire staircase.

Some offices are accessible via a classic staircase on the 5th and even 6th floor inside the pavilion of honor located above the entrance to Boulevard des Italiens.

== Later developments ==
- 30 January 1918: a German "plane bomb" exploded and damaged the wall along the rue de Choiseul near the corner with the rue du Quatre Septembre. This damage is visible today, and marked by an inscription.
- 1957: a proposal to construct a high-rise tower block of 20 floors within the old building was rejected. Heating, lighting and ventilation facilities were modernized.
- Early 1970s: complete renovation in the style of that time, intended to accommodate more employees on the site. The first data processing systems are installed. The securities hall, built by Eiffel, is demolished and the space used for offices. The offices on the ground floor no longer have windows, while those on the upper floors are organized around a small atrium, which played a central role in the subsequent fire.
- 14 May 1976: the chairman of Crédit Lyonnais, Jacques Chaine, is murdered by a deranged gunman at the entrance to the building.
- April 1996: a large part of the French film Le cri de la soie was filmed in the hall on the side of rue du Quatre-Septembre. The film was set in a department store.
- January 2013: Spring Summer 2013 show by Donatella Versace
- 7 March 2015: Fall-Winter 2013 show by Vivienne Westwood

== 1996 fire ==
On Sunday, 5 May 1996, a fire started in the trading room of the building. It eventually spread to burn more than two-thirds of the building.

- 8:24: a monitor reports a fire in the trading room.
- 8:26: two security officers go to the scene, firefighters are called.
- 8:32: twenty firefighters from the Saint-Honoré barracks arrive at rue de Choiseul. Doors are unlocked to let them fight the fire.
- 9:15: fire spreads rapidly in the trading room, a large space with no partitions or fire doors (to allow traders to communicate freely). More than a hundred firefighters are on site.
- 9:41: news about the fire released by Agence France-Presse.
- 11:00: the fire in the trading room seems under control.
- 11:20: the slab of the hanging garden located above the trading room collapses, and a huge blast effect creates multiple outbreaks of fire.

600 firefighters are mobilized and spend about 19 hours extinguishing the fire. Two-thirds of the building located on the side of rue du Quatre-Septembre is devastated. The safe room was partially flooded. Experts later concluded that the cause was arson.

== After the fire ==
After the fire, Credit Lyonnais sold the building to the insurer AIG for 1.3 billion.

Since the beginning, the building was open to the public, who could pass through its entire length, including the main branch of the bank, an office for the staff, and the international office. After the fire, the building was divided into two separate spaces. Credit Lyonnais kept the historic part, called the "Hotel des Italiens". This is about a quarter of the building on the side of the boulevard des Italiens, which contains the director's offices, the council chamber, and the double spiral staircase. The part of the building on the side of the rue du Quatre-Septembre suffered heavy fire damage. It was renamed "Centorial", in particular to reuse the logo CL on the facade.

In summer 2008, at the request of the architect of French buildings, a large lead ornament that had been removed during restorations in the 1950s was reinstalled at the top of the main entrance, 36 m above the ground. It is a decorative piece with the escutcheon of the town of Lyon, where Credit Lyonnais was founded. It is 4.30 m wide and 3.50 m high and weighs 4 tons. It was created by Jean-Claude Duplessis, ornamental artist and Meilleur Ouvrier de France.

== Centorial ==
After the fire, huge reconstruction work began in January 2001 by AIG French Property Fund, for the new owner of the building (Deka Immobilien Investment GmbH), under the direction of the architect Jean-Jacques Ory. These works had to combine respect for the historically listed part of the building (the large metal canopy built by Eiffel's workshops), the need for a modern office building, and the wish to preserve the original architecture.

The trading room (where the fire broke out) and the hanging garden situated above it were replaced by a long gallery with a metal canopy reminiscent of the original building's securities hall.

In 2006, the employees of the French business newspaper Les Échos left their offices on rue de la Boétie and moved into the Centorial. Some departments of LCL also have offices in the building.

== Gallery ==
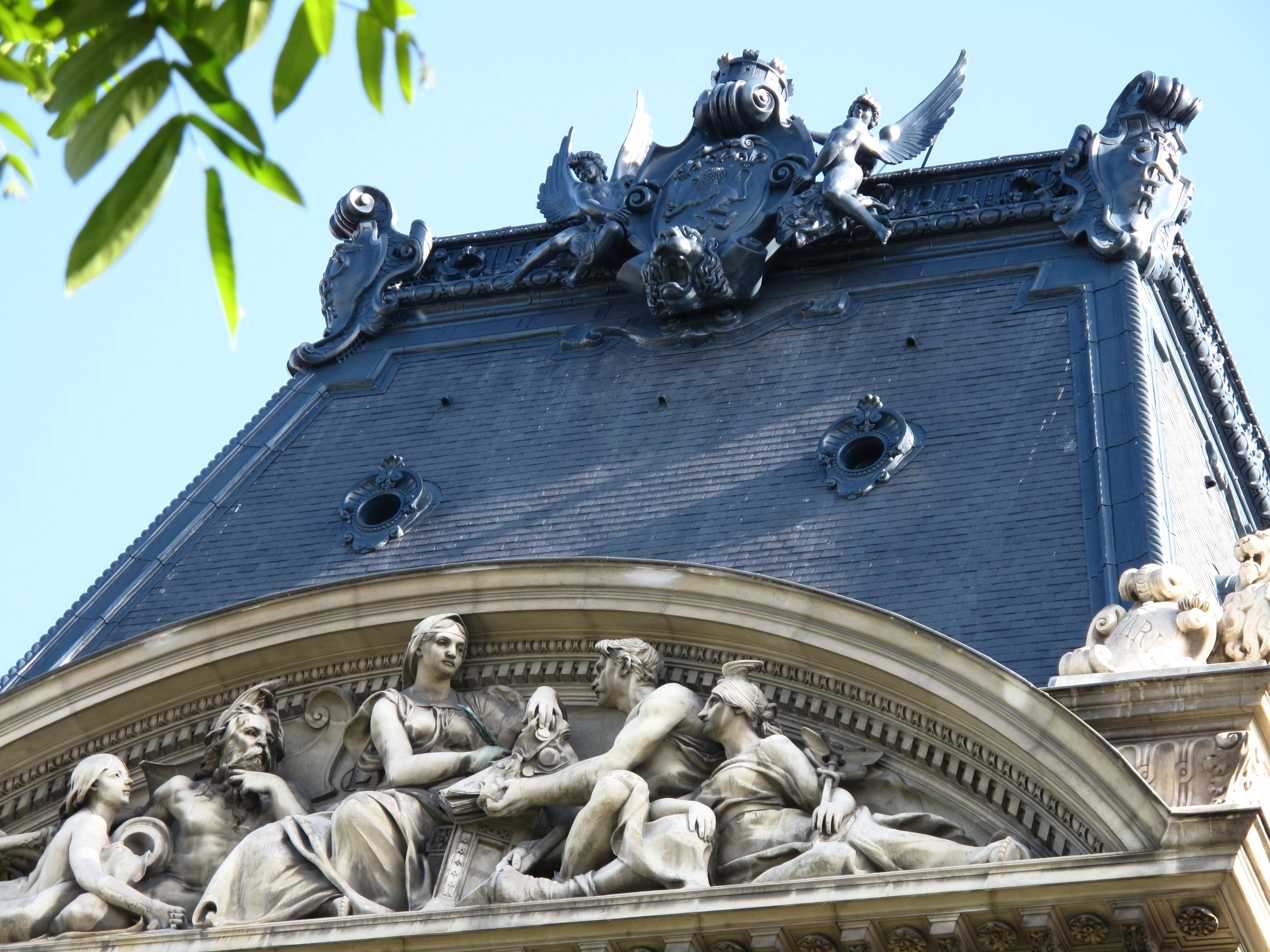
Central escutcheon reinstalled in 2008

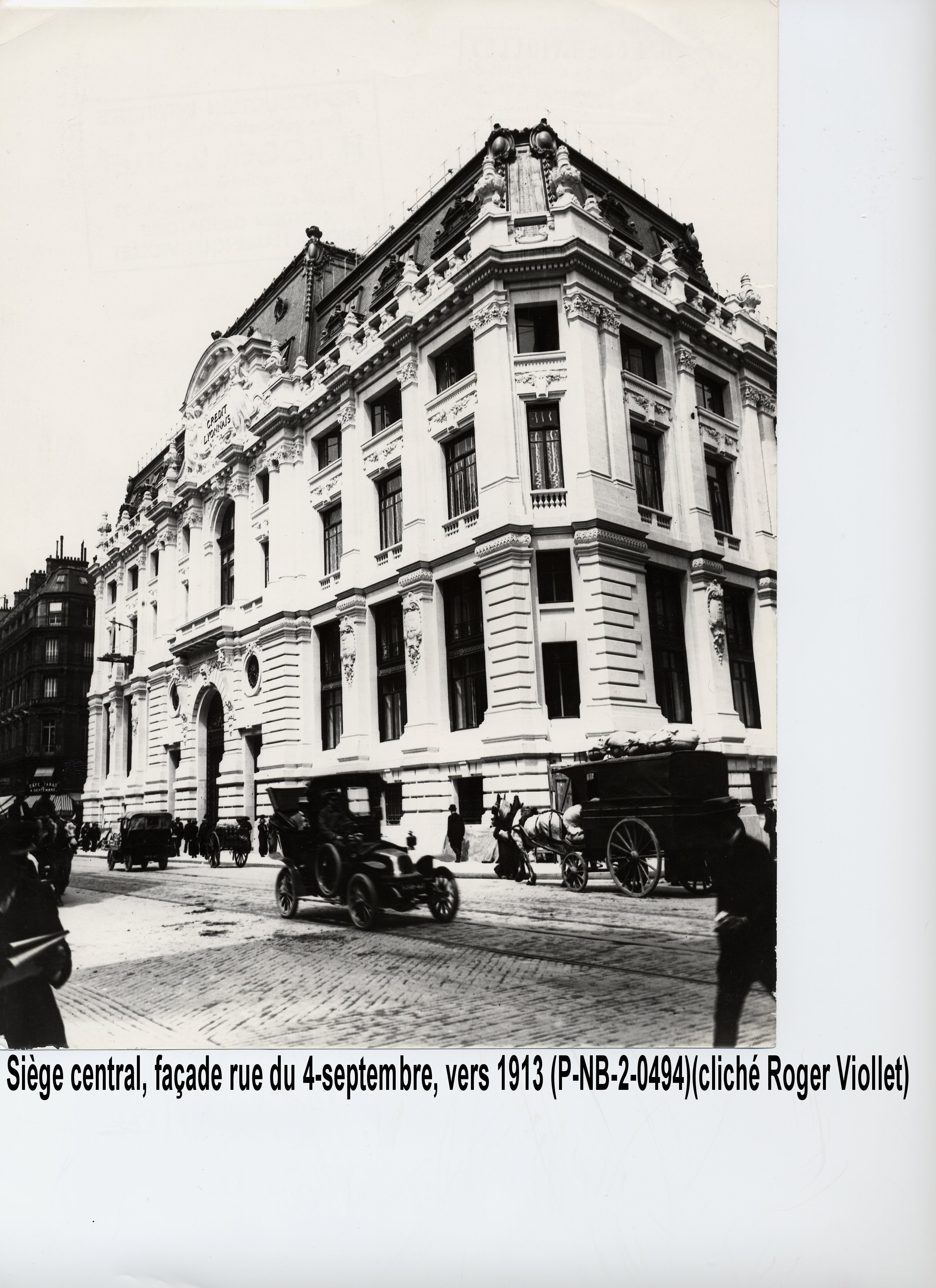
HQ, side of rue du Quatre-Septembre in 1913

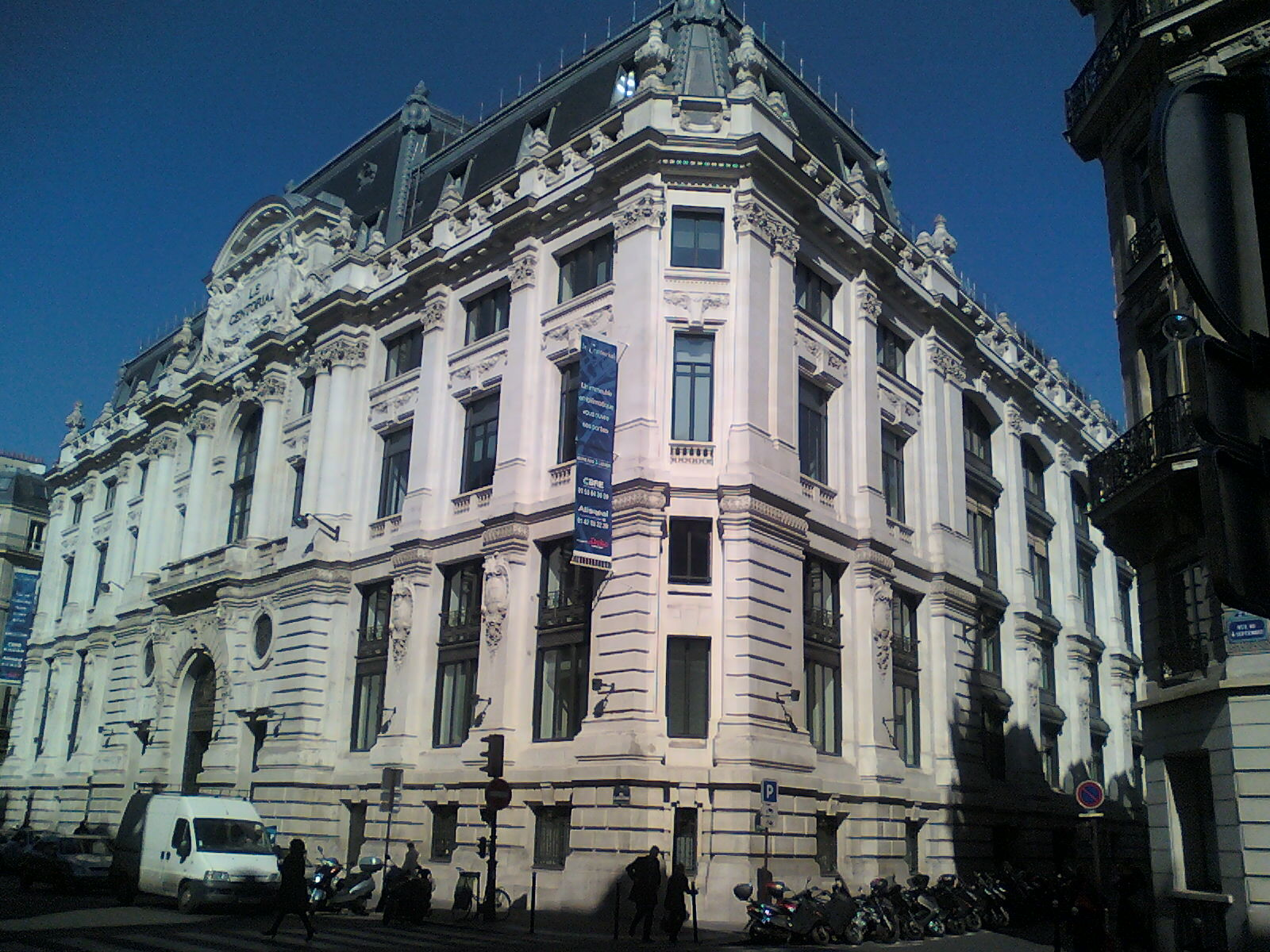
The same, renamed Centorial, in March 2009

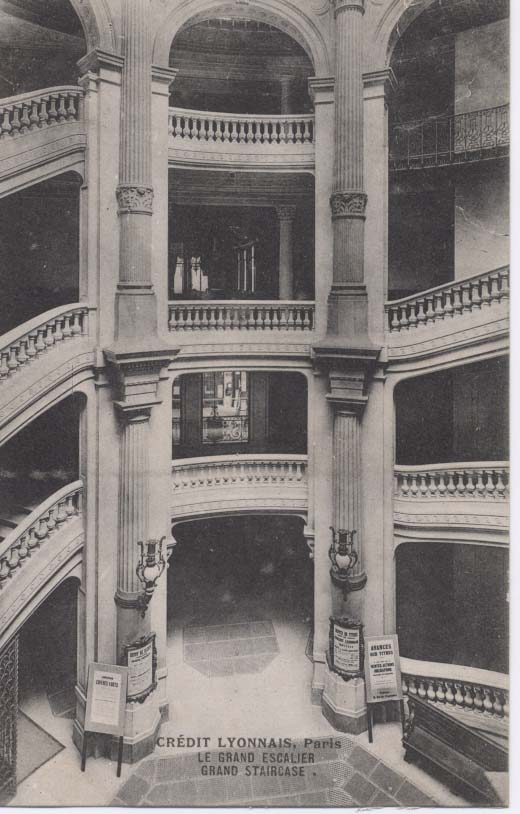
The grand staircase in the 1920s

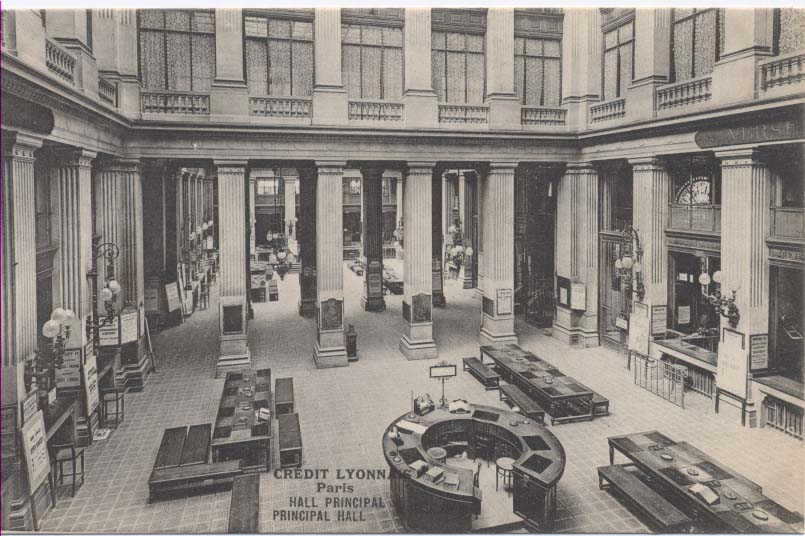
Main hall in the 1920s

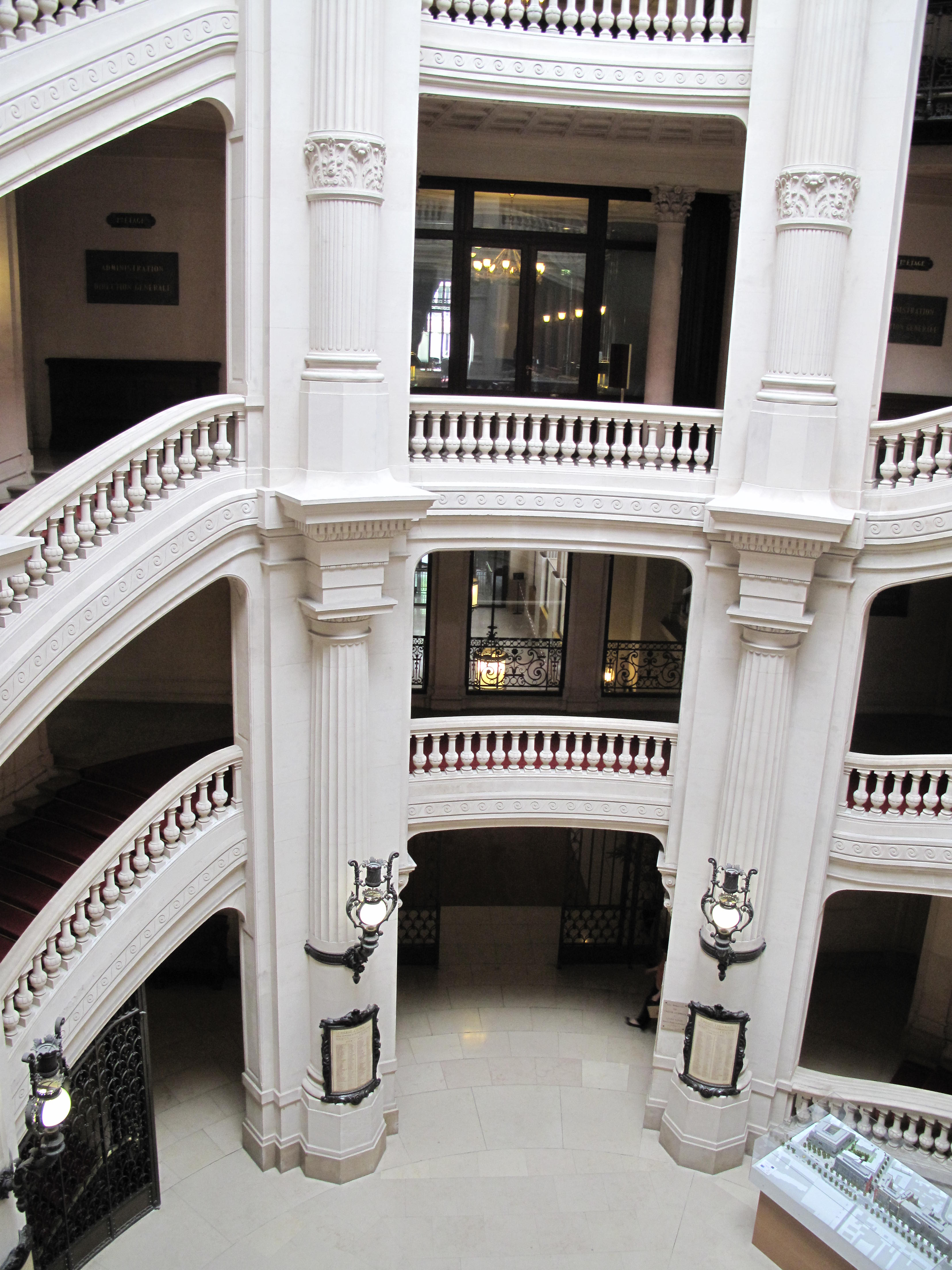
The grand staircase in 2009

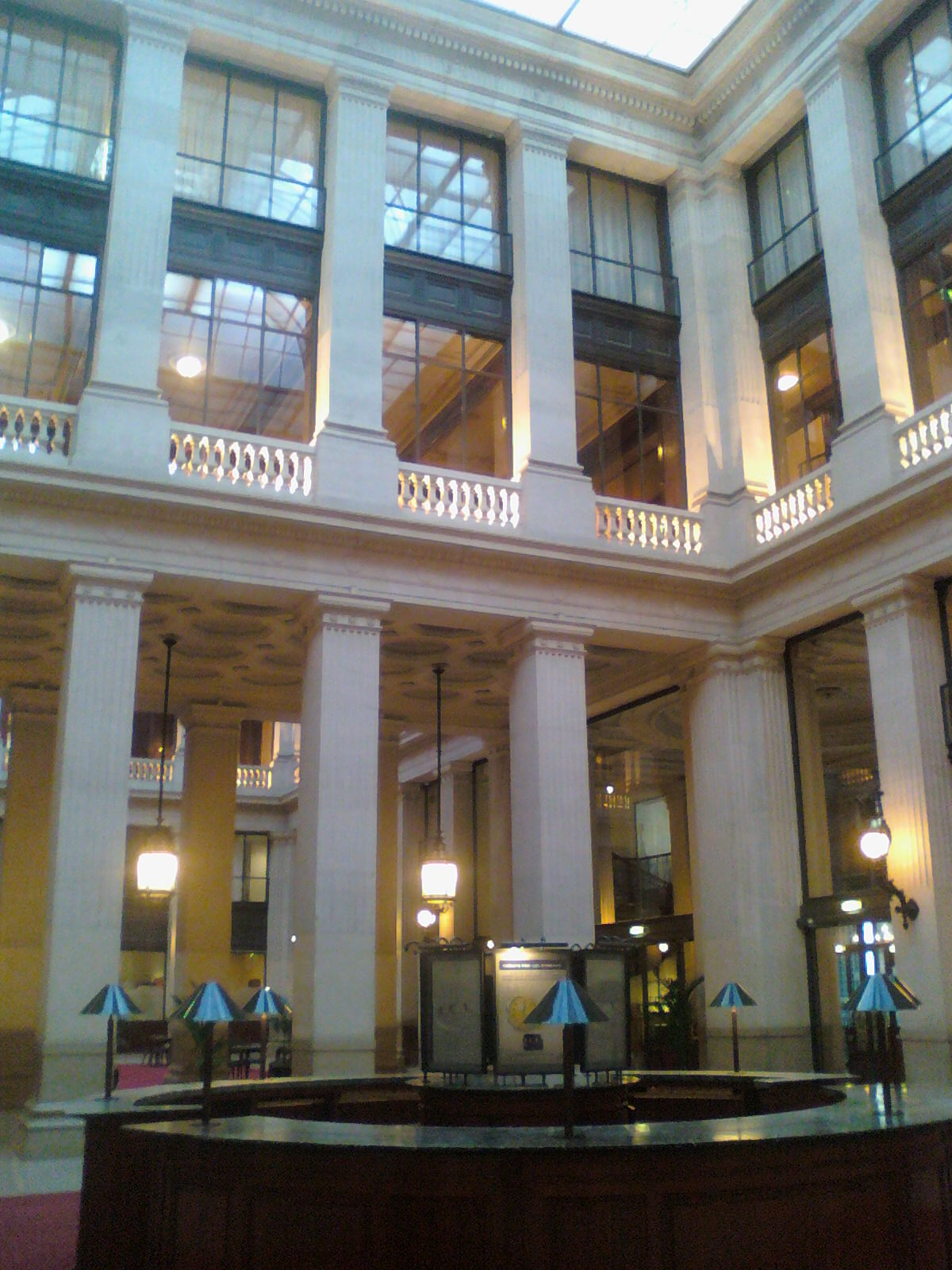
Main hall in 2009 (looking to west)

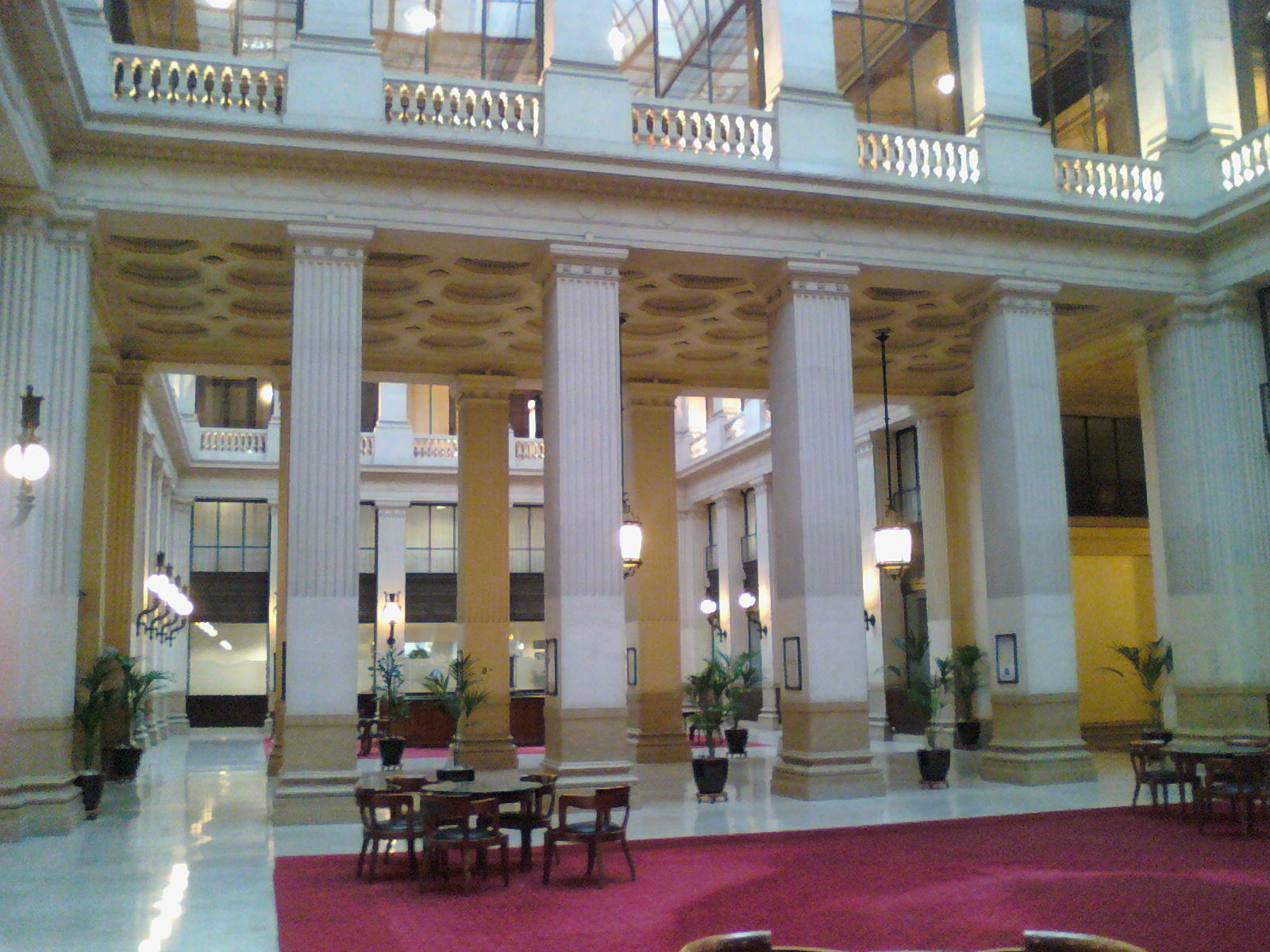
Main hall in 2009 (looking to east)

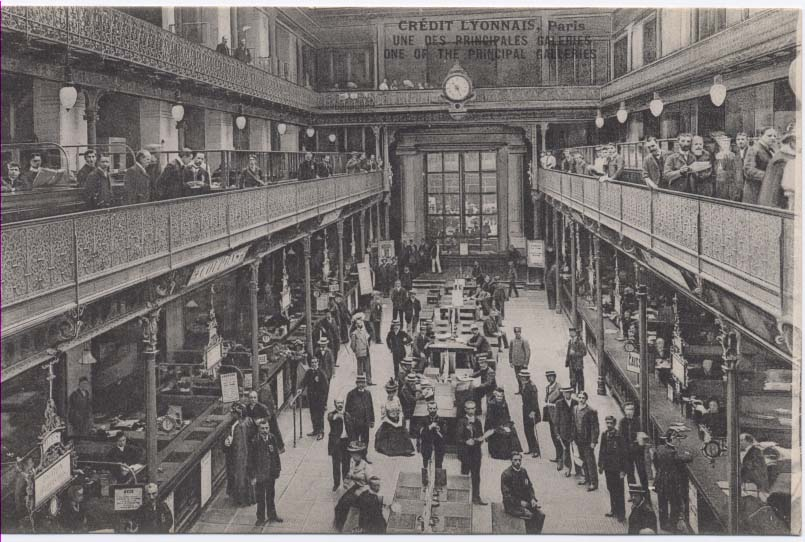
Original securities hall

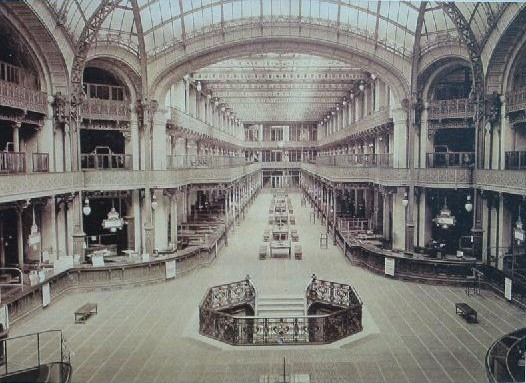
Original main gallery

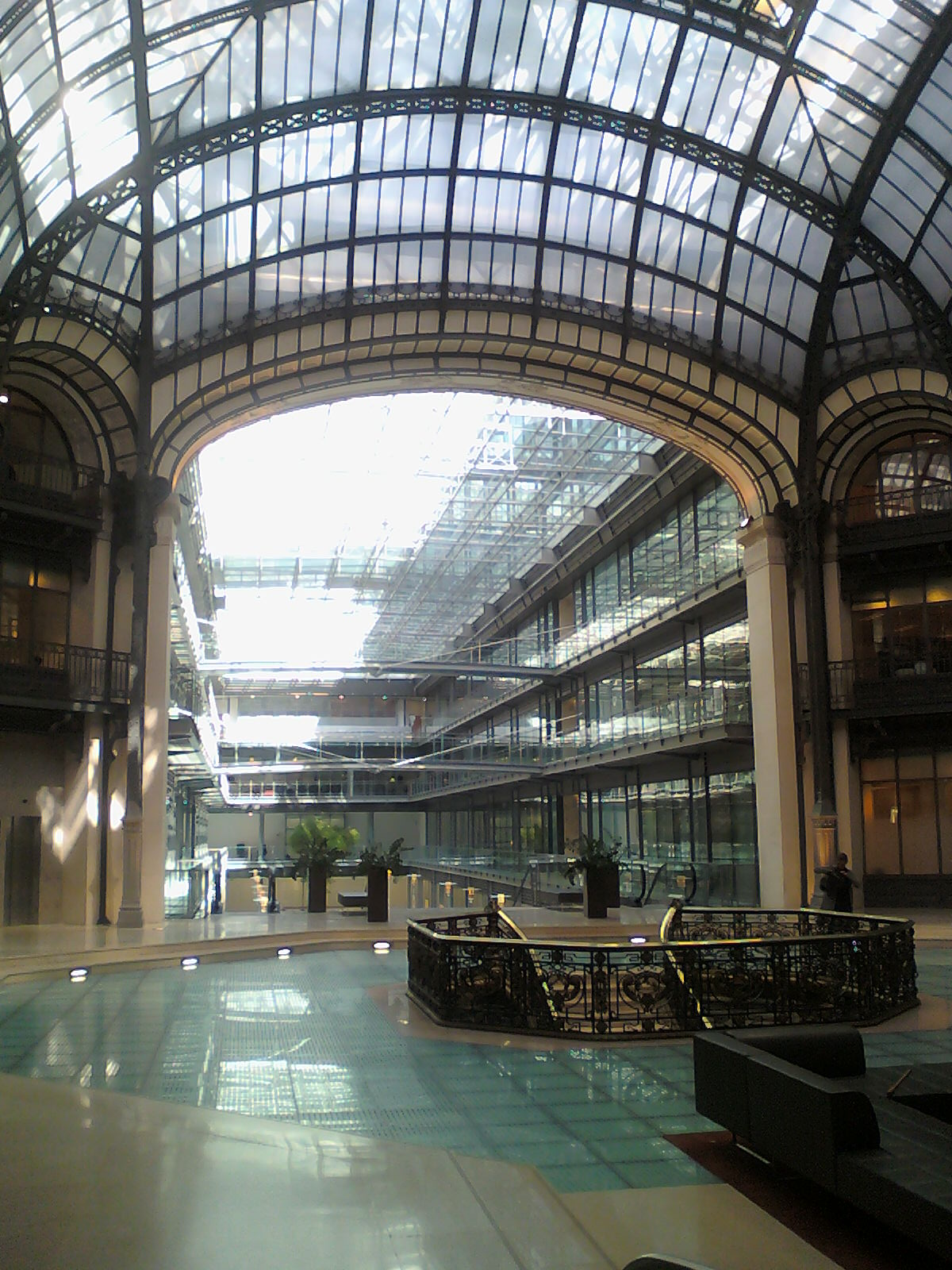
Gallery recreated in the new building "Centorial"

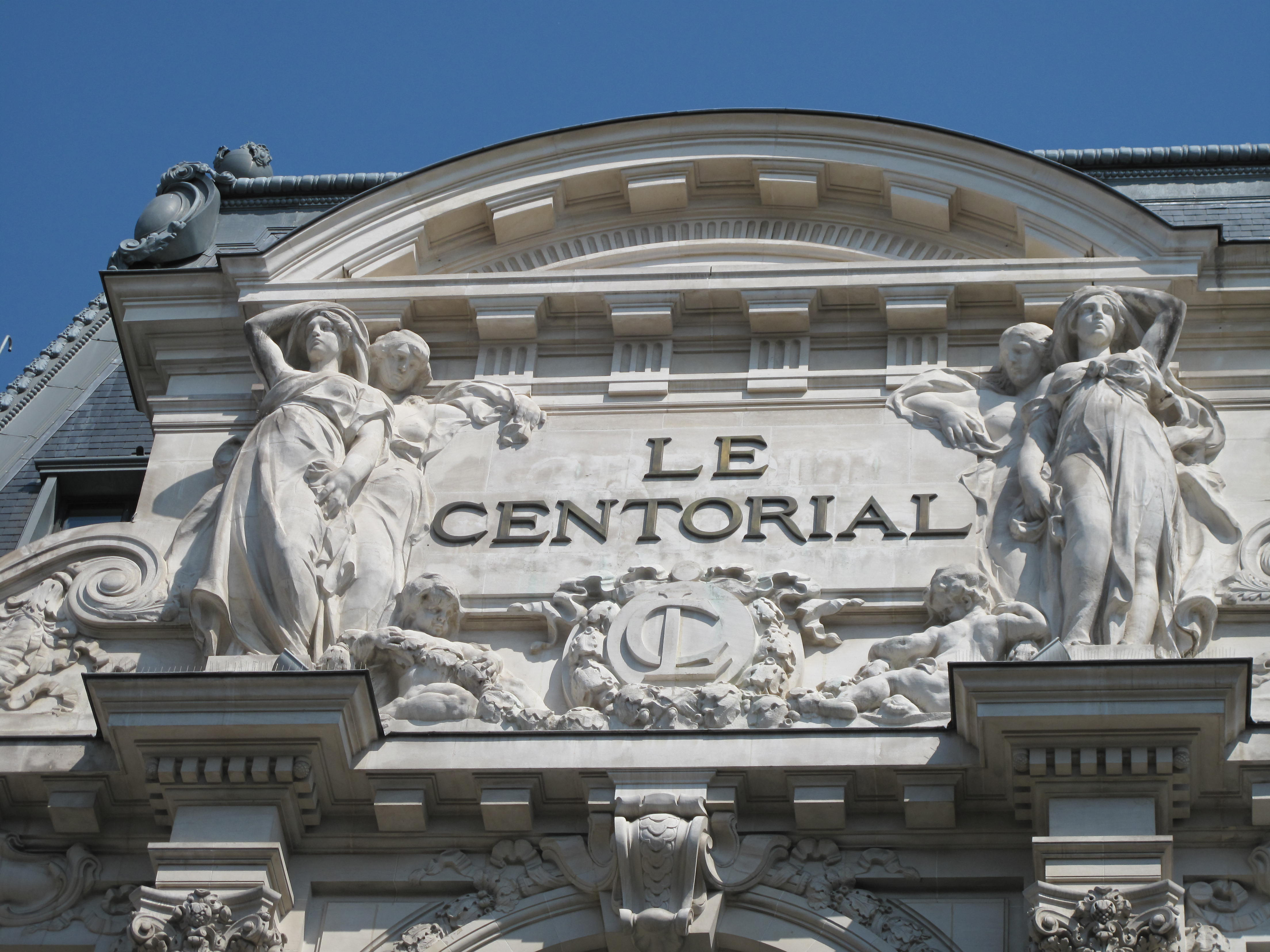
"Centorial" replaced "Credit Lyonnais" on the frontispiece of rue du 4-septembre

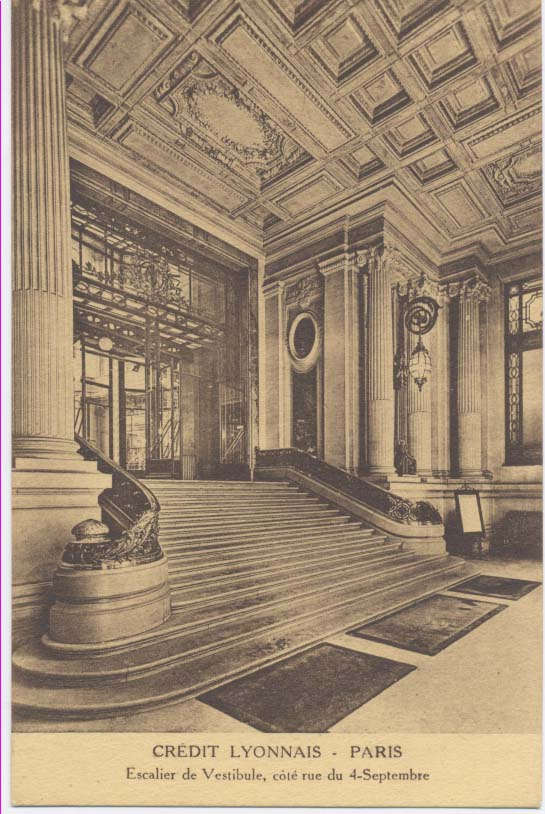
Lobby, side rue du 4 septembre in the 1920s

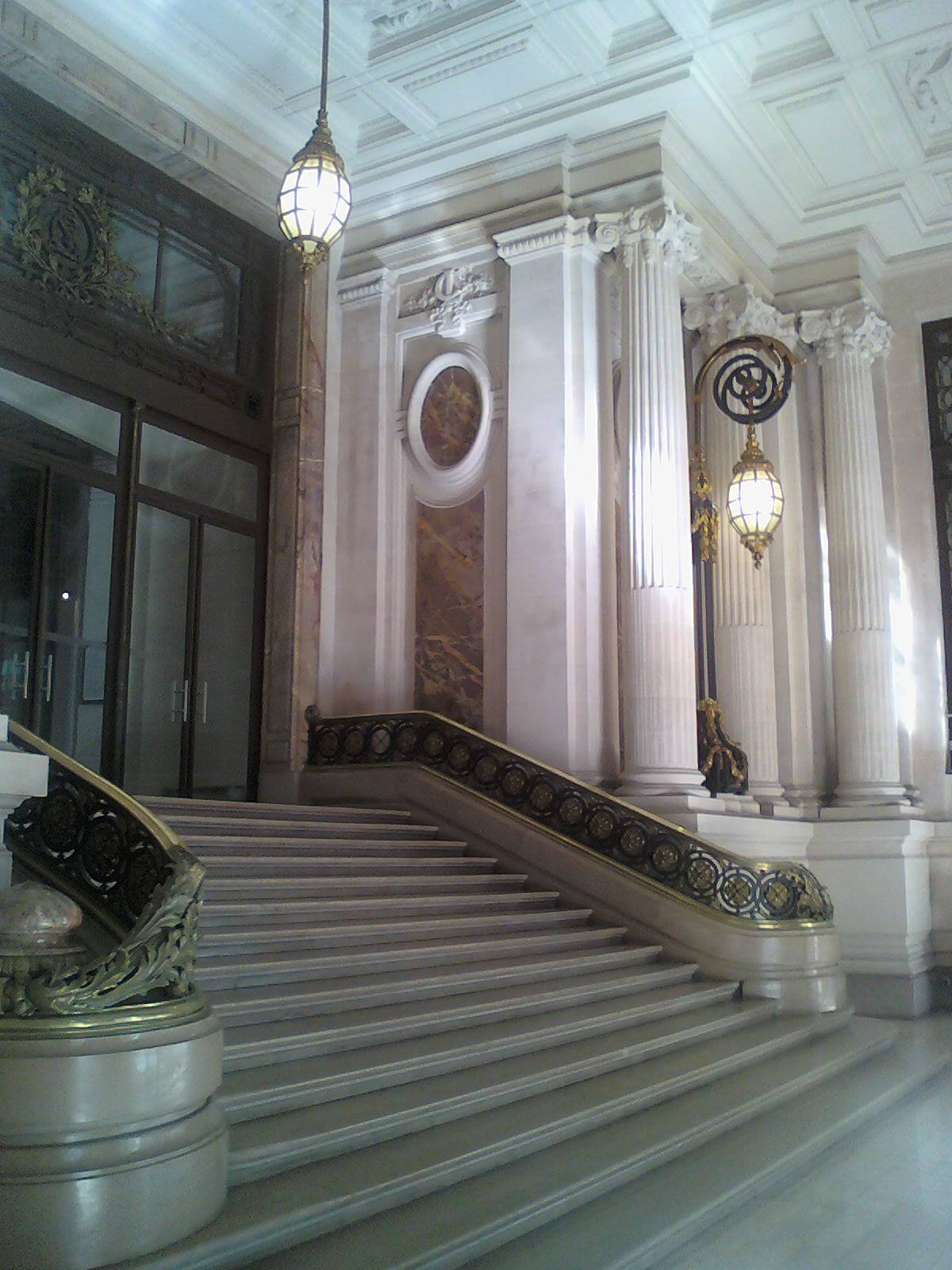
Lobby in 2009

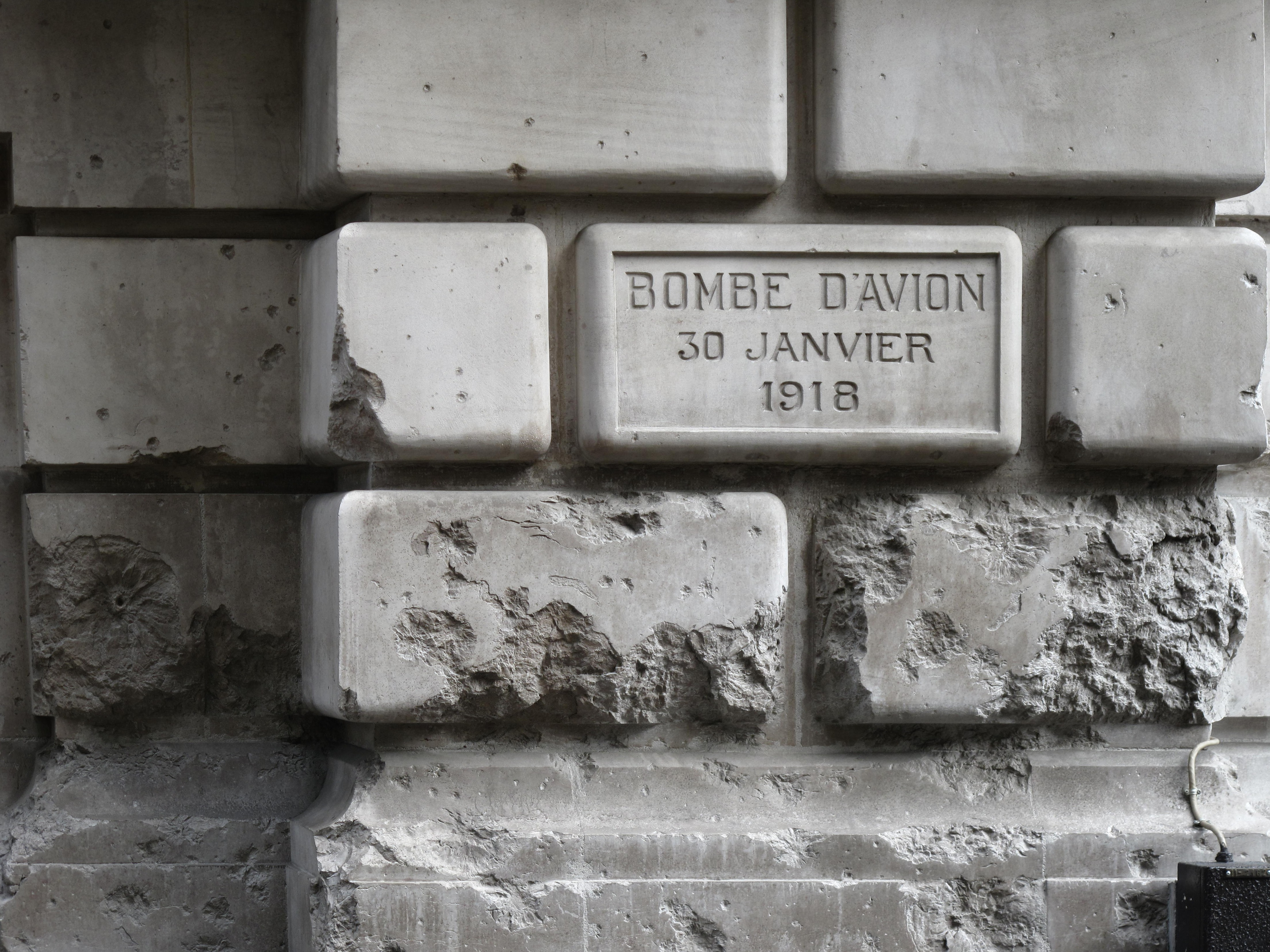
Traces of a plane bomb from 1918
