= Michael Burke (economist) =

Irish economist

Michael Burke is an Irish nationalist economist. He is a former senior international economist at Citibank in London and currently works as an economic consultant.

Burke has made several economic arguments in support of the reunification of Ireland. He has written multiple articles for The Guardian and writes blog posts regularly on the blog, Socialist Economic Bulletin. On the 9th of December in 2016, he presented his paper, "The Economic Case for Irish Unity" to the European Parliament. He also spoke at an event launching a study called "Modelling Irish Unity". He has claimed that the economy of Northern Ireland is in stagnation and it would remain so until reunification.
