= Michael Burke (businessman) =

French-American businessman (born February 20, 1957)

- Born: February 20, 1957 (age 69)
- Education: EDHEC Business School
- Occupation: Businessman
- Title: CEO of LVMH’s fashion division
- Board member of: LVMH

Michael Burke (born February 20, 1957) is a French-American businessman who is the Chief Executive Officer of LVMH’s fashion division.

== Biography ==
=== Education and career ===
Michael Burke graduated from EDHEC Business School in 1980.

Burke has been working with Bernard Arnault, Chairman of LVMH, for more than 40 years. He started his career by joining the Arnault Group’s investment division. He then joined the LVMH-Moët Hennessy Louis Vuitton group, where he held increasing responsibilities: first as head of the American subsidiary of Dior from 1986 to 1992, then as head of Louis Vuitton North America from 1993 to 1997. He became Managing Director of Christian Dior in Paris in 1997.

Following its acquisition by LVMH in 2003, he was appointed CEO of Fendi, where he oversaw a major renewal of the fashion house. In February 2012, Michael Burke took over as CEO of Bulgari, before being appointed Chairman and CEO of Louis Vuitton in December of the same year, He subsequently left his position in early 2024 to become CEO of LVMH's fashion division, replacing Sidney Toledano.

=== Family ===
Michael Burke was married to Brigitte Burke until her death. The couple met while studying in Lille and had five children together.
