= Longtze =

The Longtze is a Chinese design of racing yacht, of carbon composite construction. Longtze yachts compete as a distinct class in regattas in various parts of the world.

== Development ==
From February to December 2006, a group of China Team members led by Pierre Mas, team skipper, was testing a number of existing sport boats, sail regattas and match racing. The aim was to get a fleet of boats for its operations, part of them being to attract, train and recruit new sailors from China.

At that stage the idea came to produce a modern sport boat in China. China Team was just finishing the construction of Longtze, the first Chinese America's Cup and the first carbon composite boat ever built in China. When Luc Gellusseau came back from a sail test in Germany of the new T680, designed by Steve Thompson, he decided it was the right boat for their purposes.

The boat was redesigned and after initial prototypes were built, the China Team tested the boat in a series of regattas, including the 2007 Louis Vuitton Cup. Production of a model branded "Longtze Premier" was started in February 2008 at Zou Intermarine in the Northern coastal city of Qingdao, China which hosted the 2008 Olympic sailing venue. Longtze yachts have competed in the Grand-Prix de l’École Navale regatta since 2008, and took part in Cowes Week in 2010 and in the Alps Cup on Lake Garda in September 2017.
