= Michael Burke (Gaelic footballer) =

Irish Gaelic footballer

Personal information
- Native name: Micheál de Búrca (Irish)
- Born: 28 September 1985 (age 41) Trim, County Meath, Ireland

Sport
- Sport: Gaelic Football
- Position: Left Corner Back
Club
- Years: Club
- 2003 -: Longwood
Inter-county
- Years: County
- 2004 -: Meath

Michael Burke (born 28 September 1985) is an Irish Gaelic footballer who plays for the Meath county team. He has also represented the senior Meath county hurling team.

== Honours ==
=== Football ===
- 1 Meath Intermediate Football Championship (2018)
- 1 O'Byrne Cup (2016)
- 1 Leinster Senior Football Championship (2010)
- 1 National Football League Division 2 (2007)
- 1 Meath Senior Footballer of the year 2018

=== Hurling ===
- 1 Nicky Rackard Cup (2009)
- 1 Christy Ring Cup (2023)
- 1 National Hurling League Division 2b (2023)
