= Alice Smith (disambiguation) =

Alice Smith (born 1978) is an American singer and songwriter.

Alice Smith may also refer to:

- Alice Mary Smith (1839–1884), English composer
- Alice E. Smith, American engineer
- Alice E. Smith (historian) (1896–1992), American historian
- Alice Emily Smith (1871–?), British chemist
- Alice Kimball Smith (1907–2001), American historian, author and teacher
- Alice Ravenel Huger Smith (1876–1958), often abbreviated as Alice Smith, American painter
- Alice Orme Smith (1889–1980), American nurse and architect
- Alice Upham Smith (1908–1998), American writer, botanical illustrator and landscape architect
- Alice Smith, a character in the 1990 film Alice

== See also ==
- Alice Leigh-Smith (1907–1987), English nuclear physicist
