= Millicent Taylor =

Chemist who petitioned to join the Chemical Society

Millicent Taylor FRSC
- Born: 17 October 1871
- Died: 23 December 1960
- Education: Cheltenham Ladies College, University of Bristol MSc, DSc
- Known for: chemical research and as a signatory to the petition for women to be made Fellows of the Royal Society of Chemistry (1904)

Millicent Taylor (17 October 1871 – 23 December 1960) FRSC MSc DSc was a chemist who, in 1904, was one of the nineteen women who petitioned to join the Chemical Society

== Education and early career ==
Taylor graduated from Cheltenham Ladies College in 1888 to 1893, with an external (London) BSc degree and worked for the college until 1919, becoming Head of Chemistry in 1894. She oversaw the design and building of a science wing for the College in 1904, and later she was appointed Head of Science (1911). During this time she was also undertaking research in organic and physical chemistry at the University College Bristol (later the University of Bristol). She cycled a 80mile return trip each week to undertake her studies. She was awarded Bristol University MSc (1910) and DSc in 1911.

== The 1904 petition to the Chemical Society ==
In 1904, Taylor, along with eighteen other British women chemists, signed a petition to the Chemical Society as to why they should be given Fellowship status like male chemists. The petition eventually led to the admission of women years later as Fellows of the Society (one of the Societies that amalgamated to become the Royal Society of Chemistry). Whilst some women petitioners accepted the more limited status of 'Subscribers' following this petition, Taylor and three others did not do so, and wrote a letter to Chemical News in 1909, indicating it was equal Fellowship or nothing. Two other petitioners who studied at Bristol were Emily Fortey and Katharine Isabella Williams. Taylor was therefore awarded her Fellowship in 1920.

== Later career ==
Taylor was involved during World War I in the development of anaesthetic β-eucaine. She worked as research chemist at H.M. Factory Oldbury and in the Ministry of Munitions. After a brief post-war return to Cheltenham College, Taylor became a Demonstrator (1921) and then Lecturer (1923) in Chemistry, at Bristol University until retiring in 1937. However she continued to work in the laboratories until she died, aged 89.
