= Sibyl Taite Widdows =

British chemist

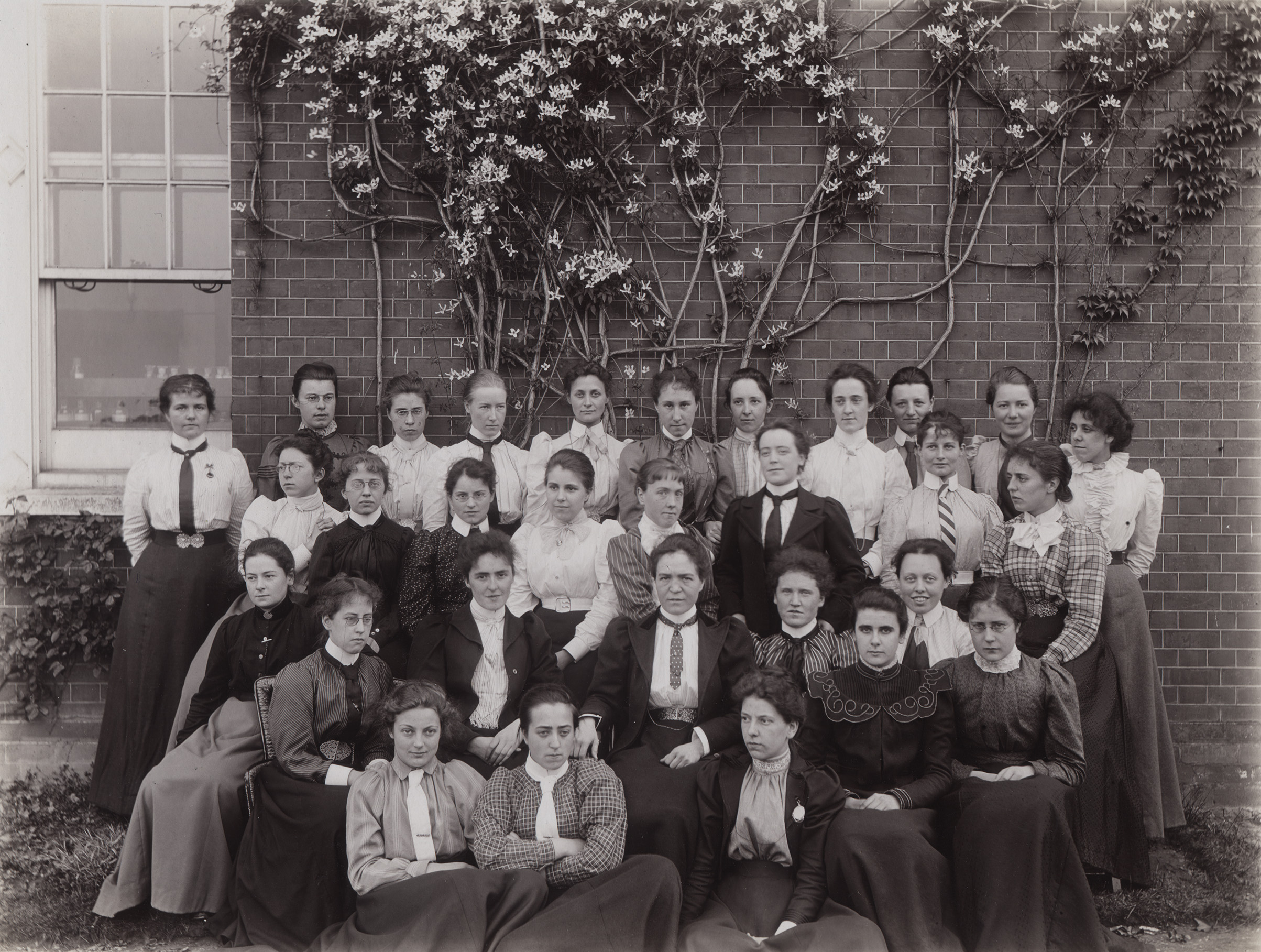
- Chemistry staff and students c.1899. at Royal Holloway College (including Sibyl Widdows)
- Born: 27 May 1876
- Died: 4 January 1960 (aged 83)
- Occupation: Lecturer in Chemistry

Academic background
- Education: Royal Holloway College, London

Academic work
- Discipline: Chemistry

Sibyl Taite Widdows (27 May 1876 – 4 January 1960) was a British scientist and member of the chemistry department at the London School of Medicine for Women for 40 years.

Sibyl was also one of the 19 women signatories of the Letter of 19, a 1904 petition for admission of women to Fellowship in the Chemical Society which stated: "We, the undersigned, representing women engaged in chemical work in this country desire to lay before you an appeal for the admission of women to Fellowship in the Chemical Society."(p. 64-65).

== Biography ==
Widdows was born on 27 May 1876, and attended Dulwich High School for Girls in West Dulwich, South London, England. She continued her education and obtained a degree in chemistry from the Royal Holloway College in 1900.

Starting at the London School of Medicine for Women as a Demonstrator in Chemistry in 1901, she was promoted to joint-in-charge of the Chemistry Department in 1904 and became head in 1935. During this she progressed to the rank of Lecturer, and stayed at the school until her retirement in 1942.

In an obituary written by her Phyllis Sanderson, her successor, Widdows was described as "an ardent feminist and willingly sacrificed her own career as a chemist for the cause most dear to her heart, the training of women doctors at Hunter Street, the only training ground in Medicine open to women in England at that time" (p. 161)

She authored and co-authored at least 12 research papers, with her research focusing around the composition and secretion of human milk (see publications). This Includes two publications with other signatories on the Letter of 19, Margaret Seward and Ida Smedley Maclean.

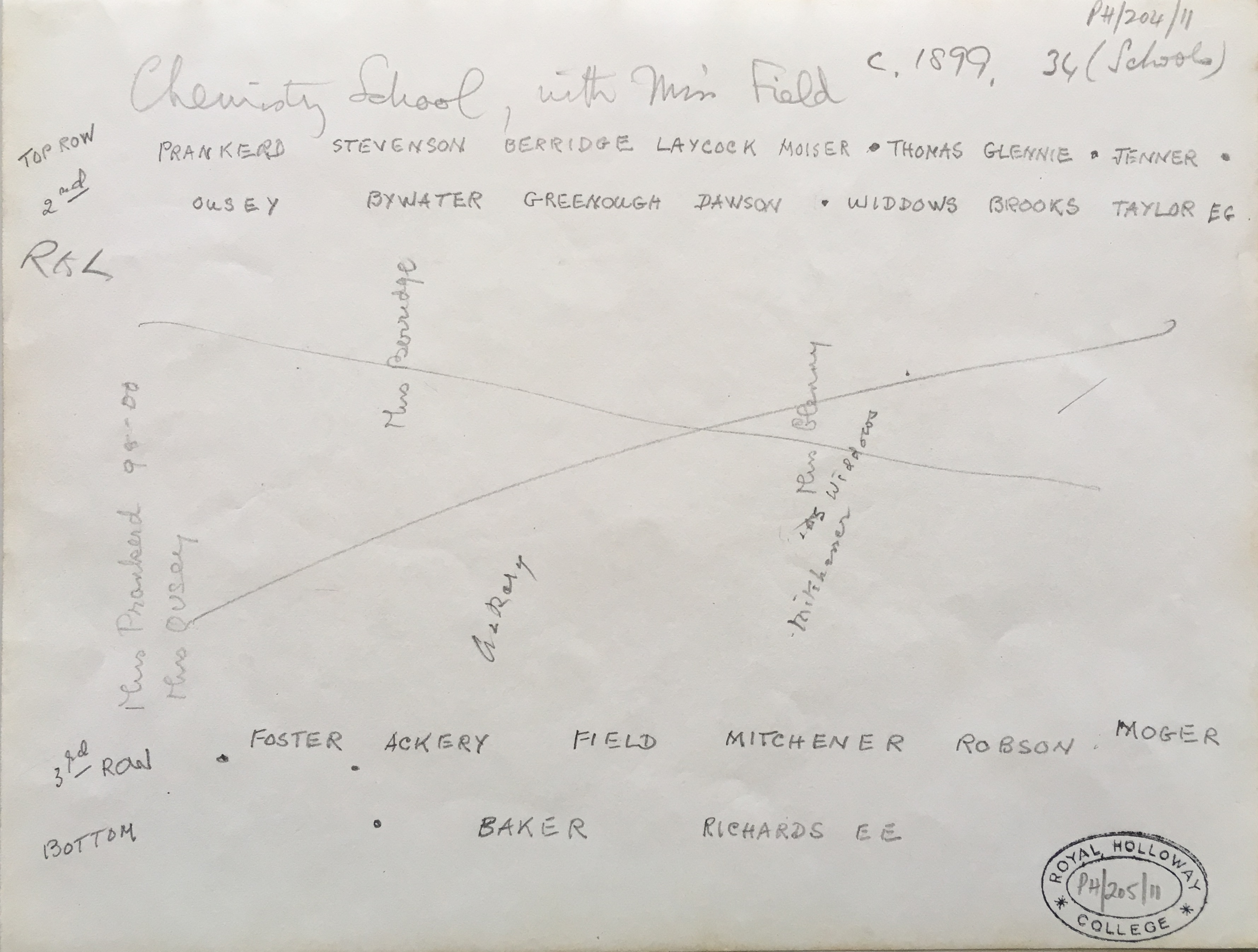
Reverse of the above photo of the Chemistry school staff and students c.1899 - Sibyl Widdows is in 2nd row down, 5th from left.

== Publications ==
- "A study of the composition of human milk in the later periods of lactation and a comparison with that of early milk". Biochemical Journal. 24 (2): 327-342.
- "Percentage of Fat in Human Milk: Influence of the Method of Extraction". Journal of Human Lactation. 12 (1): 61-63.
- "A Study of the Variations in the Chemical Composition of Normal Human Colostrum and Early Milk". Biochemical Journal. 21 (1): 1-5.
- "Calcium Content of the Blood during Pregnancy". Biochemical Journal. 17 (1): 34-40.
- "A study of the antenatal secretion of the human mammary glad and a comparison between this and the secretion obtained directly after birth". Biochemical Journal. 29 (5): 1145-1166.
- "The racemisation of phenyl-p-tolylacetic acid". Journal of the Chemical Society, Transactions. 107: 702-715.
- "The action of magnesium phenyl bromide on derivatives of phenyl styryl ketone". Journal of the Chemical Society, Transactions. 105: 2169-2175.
