= 1904 petition to the Chemical Society =

Petition for women's equality in Chemistry

The 1904 petition to the Chemical Society was a petition written by 19 female chemists setting out the reasons why they should be afforded the status of Fellow of the Chemical Society. The petition is of importance as it eventually led to the admission of women as Fellows of the Society (one of the Societies that amalgamated to become the Royal Society of Chemistry), as well as identifying prominent female chemists working in Britain at this time.

== Context ==
The Chemical Society was founded in 1841, but several attempts to allow the admission of women as fellows were unsuccessful. Attempts at change included a legal challenge based on the ambiguous language of the Society’s Charter in 1880, which was defeated because the issue of admitting women as fellows "was not expedient at the present time", followed by an attempt in 1892, defeated by a Council vote of 8 to 7. However, after the election of Marie Curie as a Foreign Fellow of the Society in 1904, 19 women signed a petition for admission of women as Fellows. The petition was organised by three of its signatories: Ida Smedley, Ida Freund, and Martha Whiteley.

== Petition contents ==
The petition was addressed to the President and Council of the Chemical Society. It highlighted that in the previous thirty years that there were "about 150 women" who had appeared as authors on some 300 papers published by the Society. It listed the number of papers in the Journal of the Chemical Society in the periods 1873 - 1882 (20 papers), 1883 - 1892 (33 papers), 1893 - 1902 (142 papers), and 1903 to August 1904 (50 papers). They continue that as the Society deemed it fit to publish the work completed by female chemists, that they should help support this work by enabling "free access to chemical literature and by the right to attend the meetings of the Society".

== Signatories ==
The signatories to the 1904 Petition are:

1. Lucy Boole
2. Katherine Alice Burke
3. Clare de Brereton Evans
4. Elizabeth Eleanor Field
5. Emily Fortey
6. Ida Freund
7. Mildred Gostling (Mrs Mills)
8. Hilda Hartle
9. Edith Humphrey
10. Dorothy Marshall
11. Margaret Seward (Mrs McKillop)
12. Ida Smedley (Mrs Maclean)
13. Alice Emily Smith
14. Millicent Taylor
15. M. Beatrice Thomas
16. Grace Toynbee (Mrs Frankland)
17. Martha Whiteley
18. Sibyl Widdows
19. Katherine Isabella Williams

The network that allowed these women to co-sponsor the petition has been examined. Smedley, Freund, and Whiteley led the petition. Smedley attended the King Edward VI High School as did Thomas and Hartle. Freund was a demonstrator and a lecturer at Newnham College, Cambridge between 1887 and 1912, as were Elizabeth Eleanor Field, Dorothy Marshall, and Mildred Gostling. Thomas, Field, Whiteley, and Gostling spent time at Royal Holloway College, from where there were two additional petitioners: Margaret Seward and Sibyl Widdows. Clare de Brereton Evans and Millicent Taylor attended the Cheltenham Ladies' College, Cheltenham and Taylor had connections with the University of Bristol, where Emily Fortey and Katherine Williams studied. Lucy Boole studied at the London School of Medicine for Women and Katherine Burke studied at University College London under the supervision of William Ramsay - both of these women knew de Brereton Evans. Grace Toynbee studied at the University of Birmingham, and was possibly connected with Hartle. Two petitioners Edith Humphrey and Alice Smith have unknown connections to the remainder, but it is proposed that they were connected by male chemists keen to promote their cause, such William Ramsay.

== Outcome ==
After the petition was received, William Tilden, the President of the Chemical Society in 1905, led agreement from Council that the Petition should be acted upon and that the Society's byelaws should be modified to give qualified women all the privileges of fellows, except for the power to hold office or vote at meetings. However, when this was put to a vote, only 45 fellows showed up, and the motion was defeated. The subsequent discussions led to an eventual compromise in 1908 that women be admissible as "Subscribers" which would allow attendance at ordinary meetings, the use of the library, and the receipt of Society publications. Only 11 women joined as "Subscriber" in the period 1908 - 1919, when the category was abolished. After World War I, at an extraordinary general meeting on 8 May 1919, the Society under its then President James Dobbie resolved that women should be admitted on the same terms as men, and the corresponding byelaw was passed in 1920. The first woman fellow admitted was Ida Smedley (Mrs Maclean).
