= Elizabeth Field =

Elizabeth Field may refer to:

- Elizabeth Field (Suffolk County, New York), an airport located on Fishers Island, Suffolk County, New York
- Elizabeth Field (author) (1804–1890), English-born Canadian writer and artist
- Elizabeth H. Field, academic scholar and professor
- Elizabeth Eleanor Field, British chemist
