= Mildred May Gostling =

English chemist

- Born: 15 December 1873; Stowmarket, Suffolk, England
- Died: 19 February 1962 (aged 88); Addenbrooke's Hospital, Cambridge, England
- Other name: Mildred Mills
- Citizenship: United Kingdom
- Education: Royal Holloway College; Newnham College
- Spouse: William Hobson Mills (m. 1903–1959)
- Children: 4
- Scientific career
- Fields: Carbohydrate chemistry
- Institutions: Royal Holloway College
- Academic advisors: Henry Fenton

Mildred May Gostling (15 December 1873 – 19 February 1962), also published under her married name Mildred Mills, was an English chemist who completed research in carbohydrate chemistry. She was one of the nineteen signatories on a letter from professional female chemists to the Chemical Society (later the Royal Society of Chemistry) requesting that women be accepted as Fellows to the Society.

== Biography ==
Gostling was the daughter of George and Sarah Gostling and was born in Stowmarket, Suffolk, in 1873, and lived on Ipswich Street, Stowmarket. Her father was a pharmaceutical chemist and dental surgeon. She attended the Royal Holloway College from 1893 to 1897, obtaining a BSc in Chemistry. She was most likely taught there by Elizabeth Eleanor Field. After graduating from Royal Holloway with a BSc (First Class), she was awarded a Bathurst Studentship, which were founded in 1882 for the encouragement of advanced work in any of the natural sciences at Newnham College, Cambridge. She completed her studentship from 1899 to 1900 working for Henry Fenton, and returned to Royal Holloway in 1901, to take up a position as Demonstrator in Chemistry. She resigned her position in 1903 and married William Hobson Mills. Mills had recently been appointed to the Chemical Department of Northern Polytechnic as a lecturer in chemistry. By 1911, the couple had 4 young children, and lived with 2 servants at their home in Crouch End, in North London. Two of her daughters would later be students at Newnham, and a third later became a staff member there. Gostling died at Addenbrooke's Hospital, Cambridge, on 19 February 1962.

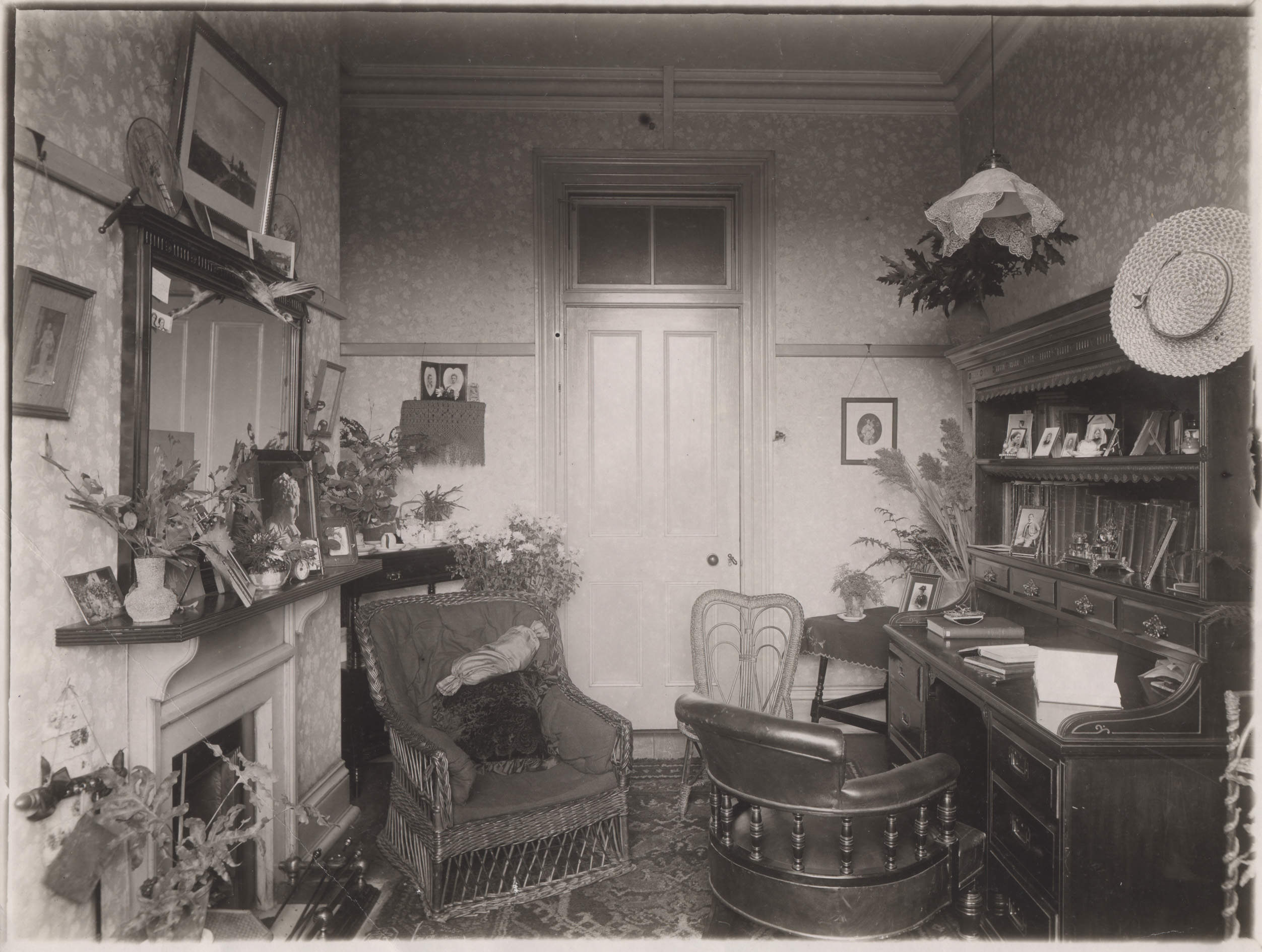
A picture of the study used by Mildred May Gostling while attending Royal Holloway College

== Chemistry research ==
Gostling’s research with Fenton involved the study of the action of acids on carbohydrates, and in particular, cellulose. She co-published 4 papers with Fenton and a subsequent note on her own. In general terms, this work explored the nature of reaction of acids with carbohydrates, and in particular the reason for an intense purple colour observed on the action of acids with cellulose based carbohydrates. This contribution was detailed in Fenton’s obituary:

“With Miss M. M. Gostling he found that various carbohydrates, in particular fructose, gave a purple colour when dissolved in ether and treated with hydrogen bromide, and this proved to be due to an oxonim salt of a yellow crystalline compound which could be thus obtained in considerable quantity and was shown to be ω-bromoethylfurfuraldehyde.”

The work was presented to the Chemical Society (London) on 7 February 1901.

After her marriage, Gostling continued to research with her husband and co-authored a paper with him under her married name. This paper detailed extensive experimental studies on the synthesis of several dinaphthanthracene derivatives, which to that point had been “exceedingly scanty” according to Mills. This work included the first synthesis of pentacene, which is of modern interest as an organic semiconductor.

== Petition to the Chemical Society ==
Gostling’s connections to Newnham College at this time meant that she was involved with several others in arguing that women should eligible for Fellowship of the Chemical Society of London, one of the Learned Societies that would become the Royal Society of Chemistry. The Chemical Society was founded in 1841, and by 1880, thanks to the efforts of Vernon Harcourt, and later William Ramsay and Sir William Tilden, the Society was being lobbied to grant women Fellowship. However, efforts towards the end of the nineteenth century were dismissed, and the issue was raised again in 1904, after Marie Curie was admitted as a Foreign Fellow. 19 women working in professional chemistry submitted a petition to the Chemical Society. The initiative was led by the biochemist Ida Smedley (Mrs. Maclean), the microbiologist Grace Frankland, and the organic chemist, Martha Annie Whiteley. The petition was ultimately unsuccessful, and it wasn’t until 1920 that women could become Fellows of the Society.

== Publications ==
- Fenton, Henry J. Horstman; Gostling, Mildred (1898). "LVII.—Action of hydrogen bromide in presence of ether on carbohydrates and certain organic acids". J. Chem. Soc., Trans. 73: 554–559. doi:10.1039/CT8987300554.
- Fenton, Henry J. Horstman; Gostling, Mildred (1899). "XLI.—Bromomethylfurfuraldehyde". J. Chem. Soc., Trans. 75: 423–433. doi:10.1039/CT8997500423.
- Fenton, Henry J. Horstman; Gostling, Mildred (1901). "XXXVI.—The action of hydrogen bromide on carbohydrates". J. Chem. Soc., Trans. 79: 361–365. doi:10.1039/CT9017900361.
- Fenton, Henry J. Horstman; Gostling, Mildred (1901). "LXXXV.—Derivatives of methylfurfural". J. Chem. Soc., Trans. 79: 807–816. doi:10.1039/CT9017900807.
- Gostling, Mildred (1903). "XIX.—Note on the action of acids on cellulose". J. Chem. Soc., Trans. 83: 190–192. doi:10.1039/CT9038300190.
- Mills, William Hobson; Mills, Mildred (1912). "CCXXX.—The synthetical production of derivatives of dinaphthanthracene". J. Chem. Soc., Trans. 101: 2194–2208. doi:10.1039/CT9120102194.
