= Catherine Burke =

Catherine or Katherine Burke may refer to:

- Catherine 'Katie' Burke, character in Abandon (film)
- Kathy Burke (born 1964), British actress
- Katherine Delmar Burke (educator) (1867–1929), American educator
- Katherine Alice Burke (1875–1924), British chemist

== See also ==
- Kathleen Burke (1913–1980), American actress
