= Mary Thomas =

Mary Thomas may refer to:

- Joyce Arleen (1931– 2023), American actress sometimes credited as Mary Thomas
- Mary-Anne Thomas (born 1963), Australian politician
- Mary Beatrice Thomas (1873–1954), British lecturer in chemistry
- Mary Bentley Thomas (1845–1923), American suffragist
- Mary F. Thomas (1816–1888), American women's rights leader
- Mary Raine (1877–1960), Australian businesswoman and philanthropist, also known as Mary Thomas during her first marriage
- Mary Sternberg Thomas (1866–1951), American lawyer in Colorado, U.S.
- Mary Thomas (artist) (born 1944), Aboriginal Australian artist at Warmun Art Centre, Turkey Creek, Western Australia
- Mary Thomas (labor leader) (c. 1848–1905), one of the leaders of the 1878 "Fireburn" labor riot on St. Croix, West Indies
- Mary Thomas (poet) (1787–1875), South Australian diarist, poet, and early settler
- Mary Thomas (politician) (1944–2014), American Pima politician and activist
- Mary Thomas (soprano) (1932–1997), Welsh soprano

== Fictional characters ==
- Mary Thomas, in the American TV sitcom Frasier
