= Mary Beatrice Thomas =

Chemist

- Born: October 15, 1873
- Died: June 14, 1954 (aged 80)
- Known for: Signatory of the 1904 petition to the Chemical Society.
- Scientific career
- Fields: Chemistry

Mary Beatrice Thomas (15 October 1873 - 14 June 1954) was a lecturer in chemistry at Royal Holloway College and later at Girton College, Cambridge where she was also Director of Studies. She was a noted educator, co-editing a chemistry textbook written by Ida Freund, as well as being one of the nineteen signatories to a petition to the Chemical Society arguing for admission of women as Fellows of the Society.

== Career ==
Thomas' father was "Wild William" Thomas, a surgeon and Professor of Anatomy at Mason College, Birmingham, and he encouraged her to pursue chemistry. Thomas attended King Edward VI High School and then attended Newnham College, taking the Natural Sciences Tripos in 1897 and 1898. She then became a demonstrator at Royal Holloway College for two years, joining (and eventually succeeding) Dorothy Marshall. In 1901 she studied at Birmingham having obtained a Priestley Scholarship, after which she returned to Cambridge to teach chemistry at Girton College. Her work here was noted later by one of her students, Dorothy Needham (who graduated in 1919):

"It seemed that in the period at the end of the First World War the schemes followed in the Girton laboratory for experimental chemistry were incomparably better planned and organized than those available in the University Chemical Department, which then for the first time had replaced most of the separate College laboratories. This famous laboratory at Girton finally closed in 1935 when Miss Thomas retired, and the building can still be seen, though it is now used for other purposes."

While Thomas is remembered for her work in education, she did publish with Humphrey Owen Jones on the stereochemistry of optically active nitrogen compounds. However, pressures of teaching meant that her efforts shifted to education, although she did carry out some development work on anti-gas respirators during World War I. As well as working to develop chemistry education at Girton, Thomas was a co-editor of Ida Freund's posthumously published book Experimental Basis of Chemistry. Thomas also organised the Ida Freund Memorial Fund. Thomas and Freunds' close friendship meant that although Thomas taught at Girton, she had input into the chemistry teaching at Newnham, where Freund was based, and a Newnham college student wrote that:

"Fortunately for Newnham science students, Miss Thomas was able to undertake our supervision in chemistry so that we were able to appreciate her qualities as a teacher."

After Thomas died in 1935, the laboratory at Girton College - the last college laboratory in existence - closed.

== The 1904 petition to the Chemical Society ==
In 1904, Thomas, along with eighteen other British women chemists, signed a petition setting out their reasons to the Chemical Society why they should be afforded Fellowship status like their male counterparts. The petition eventually led to the admission of women as Fellows of the Society (one of the Societies that amalgamated to become the Royal Society of Chemistry), as well as identifying prominent female chemists working in Britain at this time. Thomas also found a means to make a personal protest, by way of not paying education rates levied on house-holders.
