= Emily Fortey =

British chemist and politician

Emily Comber Fortey
- Born: 1866; Chelsea, United Kingdom
- Died: 10 September 1946 (aged 79–80)
- Occupations: Chemist, politician

Emily Comber Fortey (1866 – 10 September 1946) was a British chemist and politician. She gained her B.Sc. in 1886 before working with Vladimir Markovnikov and Sydney Young on fractional distillation. In 1904, she was one of nineteen signatories on a petition to allow the admission of women to the Chemical Society.

After leaving chemical research in 1904, she moved to Leicester in 1909 to pursue a political career. She was in charge of a shelter for girls during World War One and became the first female to be elected as a Labour Councillor in Leicester.

== Early life ==
Fortey was the daughter of Henry Fortey. Her father worked in India, leaving him largely absent from her adolescence. Around age 12, she began thinking of converting from Anglicanism to Catholicism. Fortey wrote to Fr. John Henry Newman at age 16, asking for insight into whether she should convert to Catholicism Newman responded, advising her to seek direction from a priest nearby. Though he initially strongly objected to his daughter's conversion, Henry Fortey consented to allowing her to enter the Church after a two-year waiting period. After her conversion, she remained in correspondence with Fr. Newman and met him in person in August 1887.

== Education ==
Fortey attended Clifton High School, before studying University College Bristol from 1892 to 1893. Three years later, she was awarded a chemical scholarship and graduated with a London B.Sc. in 1896, earning honors in experimental physics and chemistry. In 1896 after earning her degree, she was granted an Associateship of University College, Bristol and Exhibition Science Research Scholarship, enabling her to work as a researcher.

== Research ==
Upon transitioning to a researcher at Bristol, Fortey first researched in photochemistry. This work was published in 1896. She then began working with Sydney Young on fractional distillation. This collaboration produced seven co-authored papers from 1899 to 1903. Much of this research was integral in Young's book, Fractional Distillation. While her work to contribute to this project was significant, her name was not included in the acknowledgements of the text. Another notable project of Fortey's was her research with Russian Vladimir Markownikoff, where she demonstrated that the cyclohexane fractions of crude oil from three geographical areas (American, Galician, and Caucasian) were not only the same, but also matched synthetic cyclohexane. Fortey was the sole author of the paper on this work, published in 1898. There is also evidence that Fortey collaborated with William A. Tilden in 1902 on alcohol-water mixtures. The data generated by Fortey and Tilden contributed to the conclusion that no alcohol hydrates can be formed above 0 °C.

== Publication list ==
Below is a partial list of Fortey's publications, which include 14 articles and multiple shorter notes.

- Fortey, Emily C. Hexamethylene from American and Galician petroleum. Chem. Soc. J., 73 (Pt.2)(1898) 932-49
- Fortey, Emily C. Hexanaphthene and its derivatives. Preliminary note. [1897] Chem. Soc. Proc., 13 (1898) 161-2
- Fortey, Emily C. Action of light and oxygen on dibenzyl ketone. Chem. Soc. J., 75 (Pt. 2) (1899) 871-3
- Richardson, Arthur; Fortey, Emily C. Action of light on amyl alcohol. Chem. Soc. J., 69 (1896) 1349-52
- Richardson, Arthur; Fortey, Emily C. Note on the action of light on ether. Chem. Soc. J., 69 (1896) 1352-5
- Richardson, Arthur; Fortey, Emily C. Action of light on amyl alcohol. Chem. Soc. Proc., 12 (1897) 164-5
- Richardson, Arthur; Fortey, Emily C. Note on the action of light on ether. Chem. Soc. Proc., 12 (1897) 165-6
- Young Sydney; Fortey, Emily C. The vapour pressures, specific volumes, and critical constants of hexamethylene,. Chem. Soc. J., 75 (Pt.2) (1899) 873-83
- Young Sydney; Fortey, Emily C. Note on the refraction and magnetic rotation of hexamethylene, chlorohexamethylene, and dichlorohexamethylene. Chem. Soc. J., 77 (Pt.1) (1900) 372-4
- Young Sydney; Fortey, Emily C. Vapour pressures, specific volumes, and critical constants of diisopropyl and diisobutyl. Chem. Soc. J., 77 (Pt.1) (1900) 1126-44.
- Young Sydney; Fortey, Emily C. LXXVI.—Fractional distillation as a method of quantitative analysis, 1902.
