= Hilda Hartle =

British chemist

Hilda Jane Hartle
- Born: 11 September 1876; Birmingham
- Died: 20 May 1974 (aged 97)
- Citizenship: British
- Known for: Researcher and teacher of chemistry. One of nineteen signatories to the 1904 petition to the Chemical Society for women chemists to afforded Fellowship status.
- Scientific career
- Institutions: Newnham College, Cambridge. Homerton College, Cambridge Brighton Municipal Training College for Girls

Hilda Jane Hartle (11 September 1876- 20 May 1974) was a British chemist researcher and teacher. She was prominent in promoting the teaching of Chemistry to women and became known for her opposition to domestic science.

== Biography ==
Hartle was born in Birmingham and later moved to Newnham, Cambridge in 1897 to pursue university studies. She became a researcher with Percy Frankland at the University of Birmingham from 1901 to 1903.

From 1903 to 1920 she was a Lecturer in Chemistry at Homerton College, Cambridge and then became principal at Brighton Municipal Training College for Teachers, Brighton (1920-1941).

After retirement, she went on to work for women's organisations.

== The 1904 petition ==
In 1904, Hartle, along with eighteen other British women chemists, signed a petition setting out their reasons to the Chemical Society why they should be afforded Fellowship status like their male counterparts. The petition eventually led to the admission of women as Fellows of the Society (one of the Societies that amalgamated to become the Royal Society of Chemistry), as well as identifying prominent female chemists working in Britain at this time.
