= William Hobson Mills =

British organic chemist

William Hobson Mills FRS
- Walter Hobson Mills in 1943 © National Portrait Gallery, London
- Born: 6 July 1873; Hammersmith
- Died: 22 February 1959 (aged 85); Cambridge
- Resting place: Cambridge Crematorium
- Known for: Organic chemistry; stereochemistry
- Spouse: Mildred May Gostling
- Awards: See list
- Scientific career
- Workplaces: University of Cambridge (twice); University of Tübingen; University of North London

William Hobson Mills FRS (6 July 1873 – 22 February 1959) was a British organic chemist.

== Biography ==
William Hobson Mills was born in Hammersmith on 6 July 1873, the eldest of five children of William Henry Mills, an architect, and Emily Wiles Quincey (née Hobson). The family moved that autumn to Emily's home town, Spalding, Lincolnshire. Mills was educated at Spalding Grammar School and then at Uppingham School.

He entered Jesus College, Cambridge in October 1892 and read natural sciences. An injury to his Achilles tendon – sustained at Uppingham – meant that he remained at home for the academic year 1893–1894. He returned to Cambridge in October 1894, and obtained a First Class in the Natural Sciences Tripos, Part I, in 1896, and in Part II (Chemistry) in 1897. Mills began research in the Cambridge University Chemical Laboratory under the New Zealand chemist Thomas Easterfield. He was encouraged to work on the conversion of 2,4-dibenzoylmesitylene to a pentacyclic system containing two anthraquinone groups.

In October 1899 Mills went to Tübingen to work for two years under Professor Hans von Pechmann, where he worked on the same bench as Nevil Sidgwick. The two became lifelong friends. In 1902 he was appointed Head of the Chemical Department of the Polytechnic Institute, where he stayed until 1912. During this time he worked, with other staff members, to provide experimental proof of The Hantzsch-Werner theory of the isomerism of the oximes. He also published a paper jointly with his wife, Mildred May Gostling, on derivatives of dinaphthanthracene.

In 1912 the tragic death of Humphrey Owen Jones left a serious gap in the organic chemical staff at Cambridge. Mills was appointed to a Demonstratorship, and was shortly afterwards elected to a fellowship and a lectureship in natural science at Jesus College.

During World War I, a Mills-directed laboratory was charged with the mission to determine the structure of the chemical pinacyanol and identify a reliable way to synthesize it. The chemical had been invented by a German company in 1905 and during the war was being incorporated into photographic plates to improve their sensitivity toward the red end of the visible spectrum. By using pinacyanol, the photographs taken by German planes showed much more detail than those taken by Allied pilots of German battlefronts. His staff notably included undergraduate chemist Frances Mary Hamer (1894–1980). As a result of their efforts, "nearly all the pinacyanol used in the new British panchromatic film came from the Cambridge laboratories" run by Mills and vastly improved the images taken at dawn, and greatly helped British efforts.

In 1919 Mills was appointed a University Lecturer. In 1931 the University created a personal Readership in Stereochemistry for him, which he held until his retirement in 1938. During this period of his career, Mills continued his work on isomerism of the oximes, and also studied spirocyclic compounds, the stereochemistry of molecules with restricted rotation, and cyanine dyes.

=== Awards and other positions held ===
- Fellowship of the Royal Society, 1923
- The Chemical Society's Longstaff Medal, 1930
- The Royal Society's Davy Medal, 1935
- Vice-Master of Jesus College, Cambridge, 1940–1948
- President of the Chemical Society, 1942–1943 and 1943–1944

=== Family ===
Mills married fellow-chemist Mildred May Gostling in 1903. They had three daughters and a son: Marjorie, Sylvia Margaret, Isabel and William George Quincy. Mills died at his home, 23 Storeys Way, Cambridge on 22 February 1959; he was survived by his wife and children. Mildred Mills died at Addenbrooke's Hospital on 19 February 1962.

Sylvia Margaret married zoologist Richard Julius Pumphrey at Chesterton, Cambridge in 1933. They had a daughter and two sons.

William George Quincy, a surgeon, married Katharine N Hone in 1938. They had two daughters and a son. He died in Parkstone on 25 June 1988, leaving an estate of over £570,000.
