= Mary Watson (chemist) =

British chemist

- Born: October 1856; Shirburn, Oxfordshire, England
- Died: 20 February 1933 (aged 76); Michelmersh, Hampshire, England
- Education: Somerville Hall, Oxford
- Occupation: Chemist
- Spouse: John Style (m. 1885)

Mary Watson (October 1856 – 20 February 1933) was a British chemist. She was one of the first two women to study Chemistry at the University of Oxford, the other one being Margaret Seward.

Watson was born in October 1856 at Shirburn, Oxfordshire, daughter of John Watson and Anne Bruce. Her father was a farmer and land agent to the Earl of Macclesfield. She was educated at home and at St John's Wood High School. Watson entered Somerville Hall, later Somerville College, of the University of Oxford in 1879 (as one of its first 12 students) on a Clothworkers' Scholarship. This was a scholarship of 35 pounds for three years. Somerville was founded in the same year as one of the two first women's colleges of Oxford. In 1881, she was awarded another two-year scholarship with a value of 30 pounds. Watson completed with a first class honours in Geology in 1882 and a second class in Chemistry in 1883. However, it was not until 1920 that Oxford allowed women to matriculate and therefore formally gain degrees.

Following graduation, Watson was appointed Science Mistress at Cheltenham Ladies' College. She held that position until 1886 when she had to resign following her marriage to John Style in Thame a year earlier. They lived in Charlton Kings, Gloucestershire. Style was Headmaster at Cheltenham Grammar School since 1882, but was sacked in 1906. They retired to Michelmersh, Hampshire, where she died on 20 February 1933.

== See also ==
- Women in chemistry
