= Clare de Brereton Evans =

British chemist

Clare de Brereton Evans (C. de B. Evans, 1866–1935) was a scientist and academic who became the first woman to be awarded a doctorate in Chemistry (DSc). She was a pioneer translator of Meister Eckhart's German works.

== Education and career ==
She was educated at Cheltenham Ladies College and obtained a BSc (London) in 1889 while studying there. Following graduation, she undertook research at the Central Technical College where, in 1897, she became the first woman to be granted a DSc degree for her work on aromatic amines.

In 1898 she became a lecturer at London School of Medicine for Women and also undertook research at UCL, where she published a number of papers, one of which describes her attempts to separate an unidentified element from iron residues.

== The Letter of 19 ==
In 1904, she was one of nineteen signatories to a petition to the Chemical Society calling for the admission of women as Fellows.
