= Ludwig Straus =

Austrian violinist (1835–1899)

Ludwig Straus (March 28, 1835 – October 23, 1899) was an Austrian violinist.

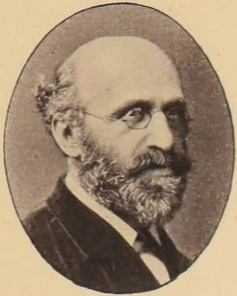
Ludwig Strauss (musician)

Straus was born at Pressburg. He studied at the Vienna Conservatorium from 1843 to 1848, as a pupil of Böhm; made his first appearance in 1850, and five years afterwards made a tour in Italy; in 1857 he became acquainted with his lifelong friend, the cellist Piatti, and toured with him in Germany and Sweden. From 1860 to 1864 he was a concert-meister at Frankfurt, and during these years he visited England frequently, in the year 1864 taking up his residence there.

He was for many years a leader of the Hallé orchestra in Manchester, and a familiar figure at the Popular Concerts in London. He was first violin in the Queen's Band. He retired, owing to ill health, in 1893, and from that time until his death, lived in Cambridge.

His playing, whether of violin or viola, had very great qualities; he was perfect in ensemble, and his power of self-effacement was of a piece with his gentle disposition and with the pure love of art which distinguished him through life. He was known for his lovable nature and his quiet influence in his work affected his times.

He was the uncle and guardian of the chemist Ida Freund. Her estate later gave money to the Royal Manchester College of Music in his name.
