= Michelmersh =

Village and parish in Hampshire, England

Coordinates: 51.03323°N 1.50794°W

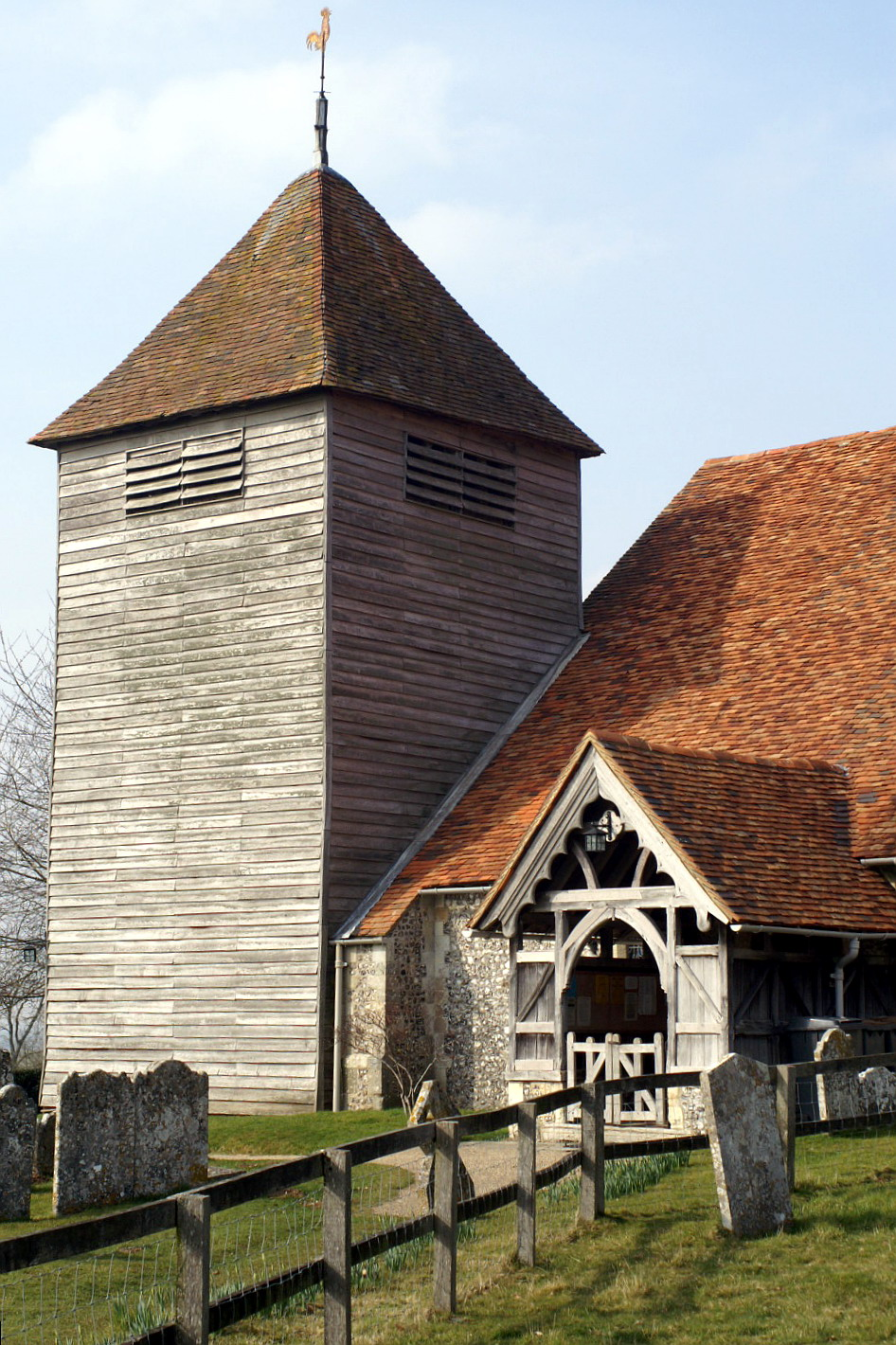
- St Mary's Church, Michelmersh

- Location within Hampshire
- Population: 735; 881 (2011 Census including Kimbridge)
- OS grid reference: SU346261
- Civil parish: Michelmersh and Timsbury
- District: Test Valley
- Shire county: Hampshire
- Region: South East
- Country: England
- Sovereign state: United Kingdom
- Post town: ROMSEY
- Postcode district: SO51
- Dialling code: 01794
- Police: Hampshire and Isle of Wight
- Fire: Hampshire and Isle of Wight
- Ambulance: South Central
- UK Parliament: Romsey and Southampton North

Michelmersh is a village and former civil parish, now in the parish of Michelmersh and Timsbury, in the Test Valley district, in the county of Hampshire, England. It is 3 miles (4.8 km) north of Romsey.

The Monarch's Way long-distance footpath crosses the parish, passing through the churchyard of the 12th century St Mary's Church. The Georgian former rectory, Michelmersh Court, is Grade II* listed and was for many years the home of Sir David and Lady Carina Frost.

The parish is located to the east of the River Test on the northern edge of the Hampshire Basin, with chalk in the north. To the south and east of the village this is overlain by Palaeocene sands and clays of the Lambeth Group. At the southern are younger deposits of Eocene age, sloping from a ridge of the Nursling sands into a valley of London Clay. It has a brick and tile works, and extensive former sand pits on Casbrook Common, now used as a landfill site.

The name Michelmersh is derived from the Old English micel + mersc, meaning ' large marsh'.

== Civil parish ==
On 1 April 1932 the parish of Timsbury was merged with Michelmersh, on 19 November 2003 the merged parish was renamed "Michelmersh & Timsbury". In 1931 the parish of Michelmersh (prior to the merge) had a population of 1101.

== Church ==
Parts of the church date to the 12th century with extensions added in the 13th century. It was twice restored in the 19th century once 1846-7 and the second time 1888–9.

The font dates from around the 14th century although it appears to have been modified at some point after 1822. The Church’s chancel contains the effigy of a knight dating from the 14th century. There is no name upon the effigy but the coat of arms is consistent with that of Roger Woodlock, a nephew of Henry Woodlock, who held land in the area during the relevant time period.

== In popular culture ==
Michelmersh is known for being one of the main locations for the filming of the 1980s British TV series Worzel Gummidge. Other locations include nearby villages of Stockbridge, King's Somborne and Braishfield.

== Notable people with a connection to Michelmersh ==
- Mary Watson, one of the first two women to study chemistry at the University of Oxford

== Gallery ==
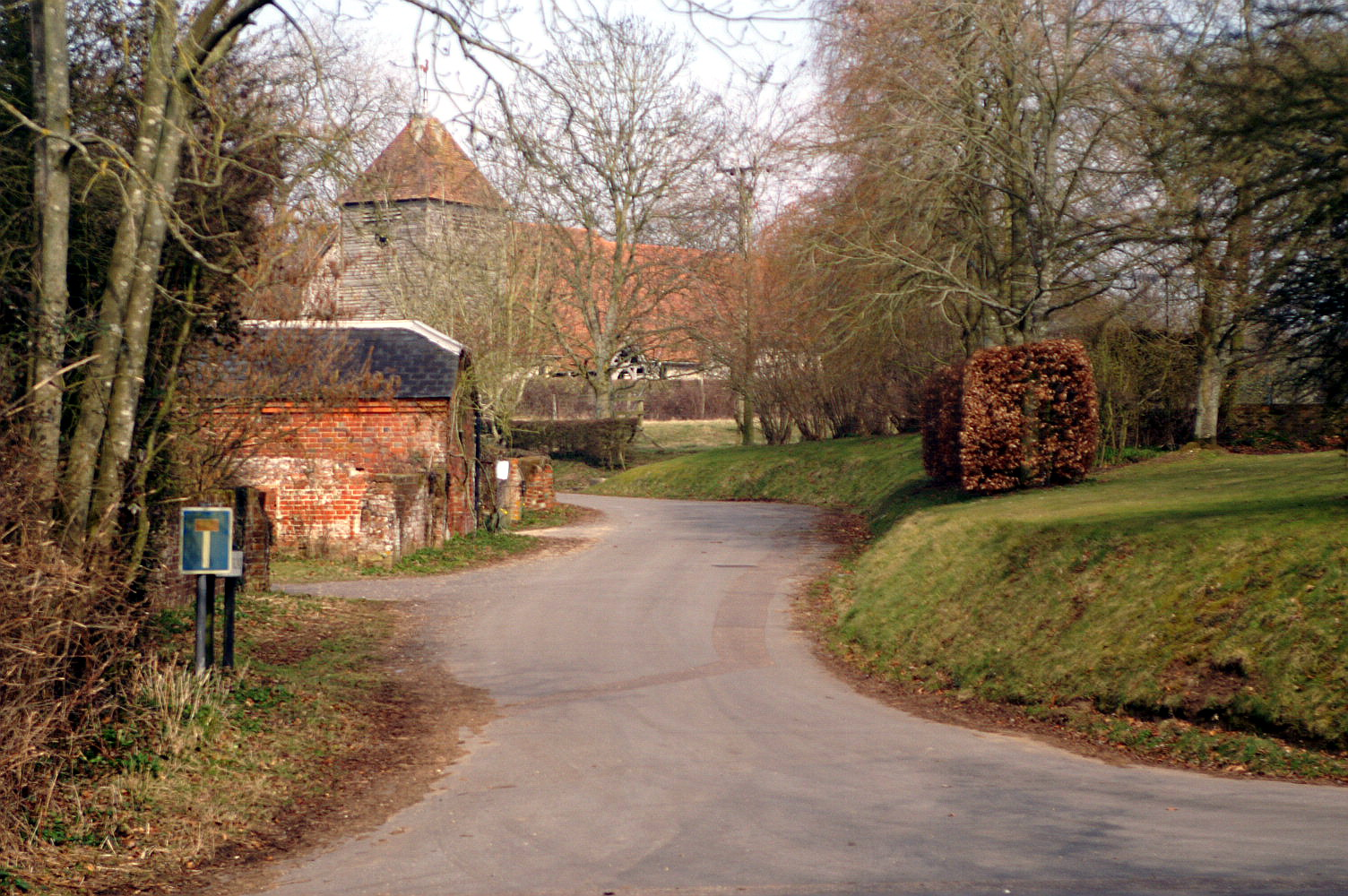
Church Road, Michelmersh

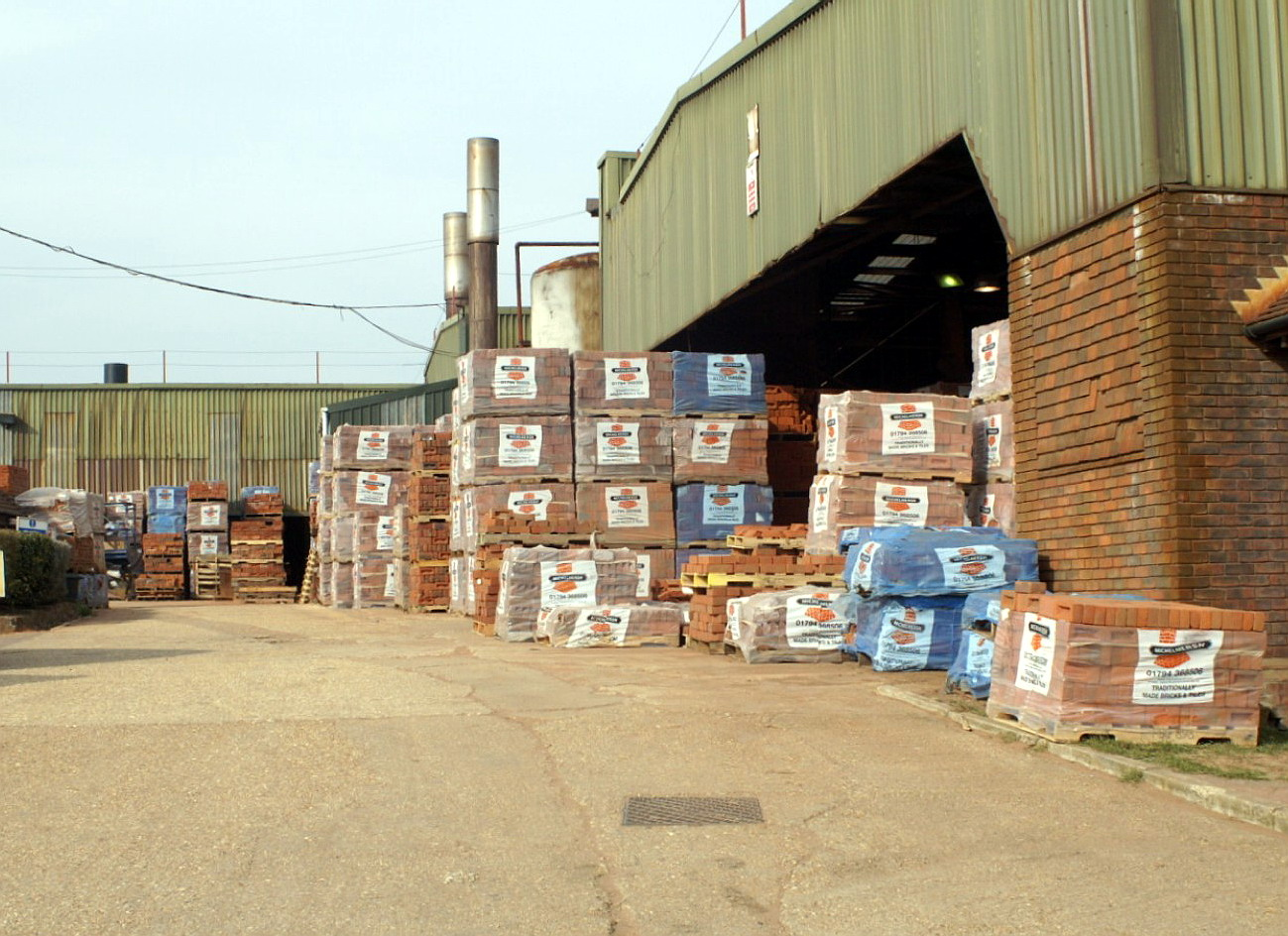
Michelmersh brickworks

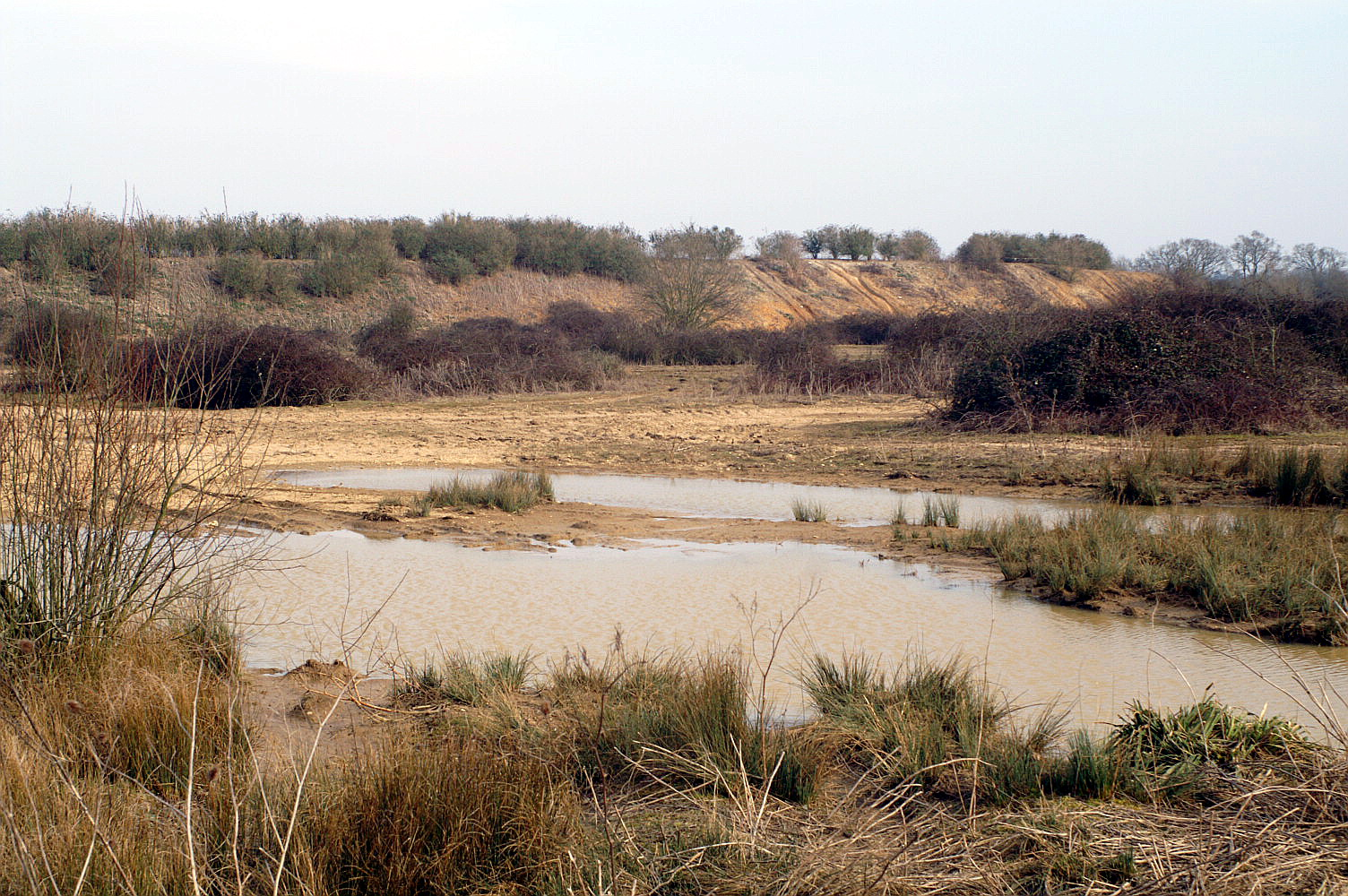
Casbrook Common
