= Michelmersh Court =

- Location within Hampshire
- 51°2′17.9″N 1°30′24.44″W
- Location: Church Road, Michelmersh, Hampshire SO51 0NS, England

Site notes
- Architectural style: Queen Anne
- Governing body: Privately owned

Listed Building – Grade II*
- Official name: Michelmersh Court
- Designated: 29 May 1957
- Reference no.: 1093751

Michelmersh Court is a former rectory in the village of Michelmersh in Hampshire, southern England. A Grade II* listed building, it is now a private house.

Built in the late 18th century, it was altered and extended in the 19th and 20th centuries.

It was bought by the broadcaster David Frost in the 1980s. He hosted such people as Margaret Thatcher and former United States President George H. W. Bush at Michelmersh Court.
