= Alice Orme Smith =

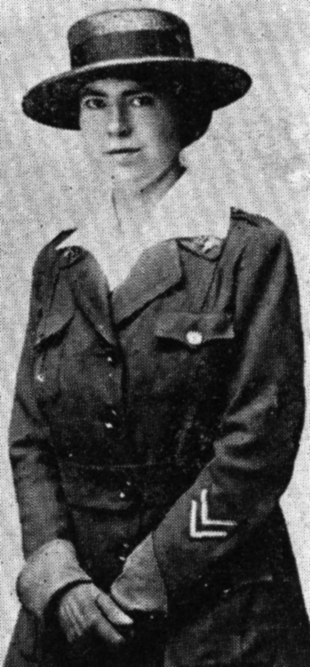
- Born: February 26, 1889; Normal, Illinois, U.S.
- Died: April 4, 1980 (aged 91) Fairfield, Connecticut, U.S.
- Buried: Bloomington, Illinois, U.S.
- Awards: Croix de Guerre with bronze star (France)
- Education: Cambridge School of Architecture and Landscape Architecture (MLA)
- Other work: Architect

Alice Orme Smith (February 26, 1889 – April 4, 1980) was a nurse during World War I who later became an architect.

She made many contributions to the Presbyterian Unit Base Hospital nursing unit in which, under the command of General John J. Pershing, they were required to work for several days under live fire. This led to Smith being awarded with a Croix de Guerre with bronze star for her bravery.

Smith also earned an M.L.A. degree while studying under a variety of architects. She designed the Main Vista and the Garden of Religion at the World's Fair, as well as many estates.

== Biography ==
Smith was born on February 26, 1889, in Normal, Illinois. She was the third oldest child of six siblings born to Mary Bernadine Orme and Dudley Chase Smith. Her parents were philanthropists within their community and both Smith's grandfather and her father served in the Union Army during the American Civil War. Smith graduated from University High School in Normal in 1907 and in 1911 graduated with a Bachelor of Arts from Smith College in Northampton, Massachusetts.

Later on, Smith trained as a nurse in New York City before returning to her hometown in Normal, Illinois to serve as the first secretary of the Bloomington chapter of the Red Cross. Alongside her work for the Red Cross, Smith taught classes at Brokaw Hospital to women studying first aid and elementary work in surgical dressings. Eventually, Smith's nursing unit was called upon to assist the war effort in Europe during World War I.

Smith went on to further pursue an education for architectural work and designed estates for composer Richard Rodgers, director Joshua Logan, former U.S senator William Benton, and Lawrence Langner.

Smith died at 91 years old in Fairfield, Connecticut, on April 4, 1980.

== World War I service ==
Smith served as a nurse during World War I from May 1917 until February 1919 alongside American, British, and French forces.

In May of 1917, Smith was informed by the Presbyterian Base Unit Hospital that she would need to report back to New York City and prepare to be mobilized for active service. Once she arrived, her unit sailed from New York City on the St. Louis and arrived in England on May 23, 1917. The unit was attached to No. 1 General Hospital, British Expeditionary Force, at Etretat, France, and arrived on June 2, 1917. The hospital would send out mobile hospitals to various battlefields throughout the course of the war and, by July, Smith would be on active duty in Paris with an American mobile hospital serving the French military forces.

This unit's mobile hospitals regularly experienced mortar and gunfire from the ground and air. Smith recounted experiencing enemy fire during active encounters, including the Meuse-Argonne Offensive battle. Smith's mobile unit worked for several days under live fire. She later spoke of her experiences, mentioning a bombardment where shelling hit the hospital she was working out of. Patients were killed in their beds and hospital staff took shelter and waited until they could regain entry to the hospital and help the injured. Eventually, hospital staff returned to the operating room wearing tin hats and gas masks. Two hours later, “the roar of the guns came back and part of the operating room was blown off.” The hospital staff had to retreat and evacuate the patients that remained.

Once the Armistice was reached, Alice's unit moved on to other needed areas, but not before giving 400 Americans last rites. Under the command of General John J. Pershing, Smith's unit was awarded commendation.

== Architecture ==
After her return from deployment, Smith worked for architect Earl Reed and landscape architect Ralph Rodney Root from 1920 to 1923. During this time, Smith enrolled at the Armour Institute's College of Architecture where she received a Master's degree in 1923. She also attended the Cambridge School of Architecture and Landscape Design where she earned an M.L.A. that was officially awarded to her in 1935 upon the school's merger with Smith College.

From 1925 to 1926, Smith was employed by Harold Hill Blossom and, after graduating from the Cambridge School, moved to New York City. She then worked with Beatrix Farrand on plans for Dumbarton Oaks in Washington, D.C. as well as the walled Chinese garden at John D. Rockefeller's estate in Maine.

From 1930 to 1932, Smith worked in Peking, China where she produced measured drawings of Chinese gardens for the Swedish architect Oswald Siren. In 1932, she opened her own landscape design office in New York City and operated offices out of Connecticut as well.

Smith contributed to a variety of designs alongside residential commissions, such as the grounds of the American Shakespeare Theatre in Connecticut, the Garden of Today and the Garden of Religion for the 1939 New York World's Fair, as well as the grounds of the Bridgeport Museum of Art, Science and Industry.

== Awards ==
- Smith was awarded the Croix de Guerre with bronze star for her military service.
- In 1939, Smith won an award from the New York Times for her designs of the Main Vista and the Garden of Religion at the World's Fair in New York.
- In 1973, Smith was awarded the Smith College medal for "bringing men and nature into harmony in landscape."
- in 1974, Smith was elected a Fellow of the American Society of Landscape Architecture.
- Smith also won medals for New York Horticultural society and the Garden Club of America.
