= Alice Upham Smith =

Botanical illustrator, landscape architect (b. 1908, d. 1998)

Alice Upham Smith (4 April 1908–12 December 1998) was a writer, botanical illustrator and one of the earliest professional American women landscape architects.

== Early life and education ==
She was born Alice Upham in Duluth, Minnesota, in 1908, the daughter of Thomas and Anna I. Upham. From 1927 to 1928 she studied at Carleton College from 1927 to 1928, and afterwards at the University of Minnesota (1929), the University of Edinburgh (1930), and Cambridge School of Architecture and Landscape Architecture (1931–2), the first institution that provided women with graduate training in the professions of architecture and landscape architecture in a single faculty. In 1933 she married Dr Eastman Smith.

== Career ==
Upham Smith and her husband lived in Columbia, Missouri, and both taught at the University of Missouri. She set up a private practice as a landscape architect and took on residential and commercial commissions. She also worked in the educational sphere, as a landscape consultant to institutions including Stephens College.

Upham Smith was particularly noted for her writing and illustrating on plants, gardens and landscape design. She published and illustrated three books: Trees in a Winter Landscape and Patios, Terraces, Decks and Roof Gardens (both published in 1969), and A Distinctive Setting for Your House (1973).

In a long career, she also wrote many articles and reviews for publications including House & Garden, Woman's Day and American Horticulturalist (published by the American Horticultural Society), and was made a Fellow of the Garden Writers Association of America.

== Later life and death ==
Upham Smith moved to Mountain Home, Arkansas, in the early 1960s and continued to practise professionally there. She donated notebooks, photographs of her designs, sketches, drawings and articles (published between 1939 and 1987) to the University of Arkansas Libraries Special Collections in 1992, and died in Mountain Home, aged 90, in 1998.
