= Elizabeth H. Field =

American scientist

Elizabeth Hirak Field is an academic scholar and professor in the University of Iowa’s Department of Internal Medicine.

== Education ==
Field received her BS degree in physics (magna cum laude) from Millersville University of Pennsylvania. She received her MD degree from Penn State's Hershey Medical Center, where she also performed her residency in internal medicine. She conducted a five-year postdoctoral fellowship in both immunology and rheumatology at Stanford University School of Medicine, Stanford, California.

== Career and research ==
Field has served as a professor in the Department of Internal Medicine, University of Iowa College of Medicine, Iowa City, Iowa, since 1986. She also directs the VA Medical Center. Iowa Regional Histocompatibility and Immunogenetics Laboratory .

Field has conducted research in transplantation immunology, immunologic tolerance and CD4+CD25+ regulatory cells and has a patent pending for: CD4+CD25+ Inhibitory Hybridoma Clones. Field's research focuses on mechanisms of acquired immunologic tolerance by studying mouse models of neonatal tolerance and acquired tolerance in the adult.

In addition, she has written numerous articles for peer-reviewed publications and has a variety of ongoing research support work.

== Awards and honors ==
- VA Career Development Award, Northern Illinois Chapter of the Lupus Foundation
- Outstanding Investigator of the Central Society for Clinical Research
- Alumni Fellow Award, Penn State University College of Medicine
- 2006 Millersville University of Pennsylvania commencement speaker
- Invited Speaker at the Keystone Symposium
- Invited Speaker at the 6th Basic Sciences Symposium of the Transplantation Society in Asilomar, CA.
- Invited Speaker at the 32nd Annual Immunology Conference in Chicago
- Northern California Chapter of the Arthritis Foundation Fellowship
- Pfizer Medical Research Merit Award
- ARA Senior Rheumatology Scholar Award
- Giannini Foundation Medical Research Fellow and Teaching Recognition for Introduction to Clinical Medicine.
