= Katharine Isabella Williams =

British chemist

- Born: c. 1848; Llanvapley, Monmouthshire
- Died: 16 January 1917; Bristol
- Citizenship: United Kingdom
- Education: King Edward VI High School for Girls, University College Bristol
- Known for: Signatory to 1904 petition to join the Chemistry Society
- Scientific career
- Fields: Food analysis
- Institutions: University College Bristol
- Academic advisors: William Ramsay

Katharine Isabella Williams (c. 1848 - 16 January 1917) was a British chemist who became a student, aged 29, at University College Bristol. She was known for her collaboration in the 1880s with Nobel prize winning Scottish chemist, William Ramsay and was also one of the signatories of the 1904 petition for the admission of women to the Chemical Society.

== Life ==
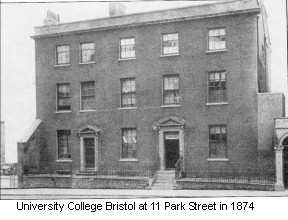
University College Bristol

Katharine Williams was born at Llanvapley in Monmouthshire, daughter of Thomas Williams, later Dean of Llandaff. She was educated at King Edward VI High School for Girls, Birmingham. She resided for much of her life with her elder sister Elizabeth at Llandaff House, 1 Pembroke Vale, in Clifton, Bristol, where she died in 1917.

== Research ==
She worked with William Ramsay on studies of atmospheric gases, before moving on to conduct her own research in food analysis. She published for over 14 years, authoring 10 papers, including two published in the Journal of the American Chemical Society (1904 and 1907). In 1909 she was one of the 24 female members of the 7th International Chemical Congress in London, and in 1910, by which time she was in her sixties, she gained a B.Sc. by research from University College Bristol, where she was considered to be one of the few advanced students capable of performing research.

Chemistry Department at the University of Bristol, in 1898-1899, 1902-1903 and 1907-1908. Katherine Isabelle Williams is likely to be in these pics although there are sadly no markings on the pictures to identify her.

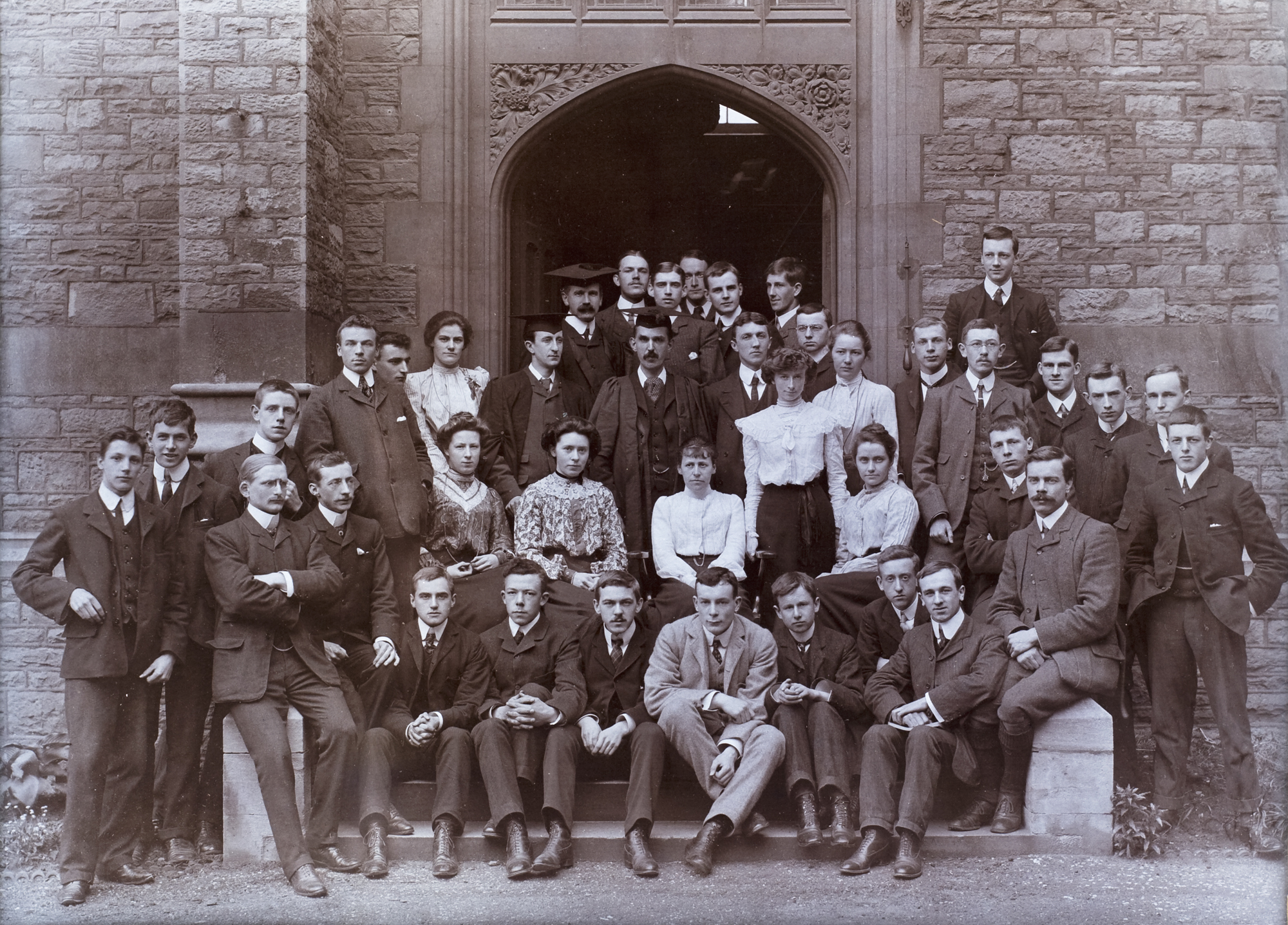
Chemistry Department staff and students, University College Bristol, 1902-1903

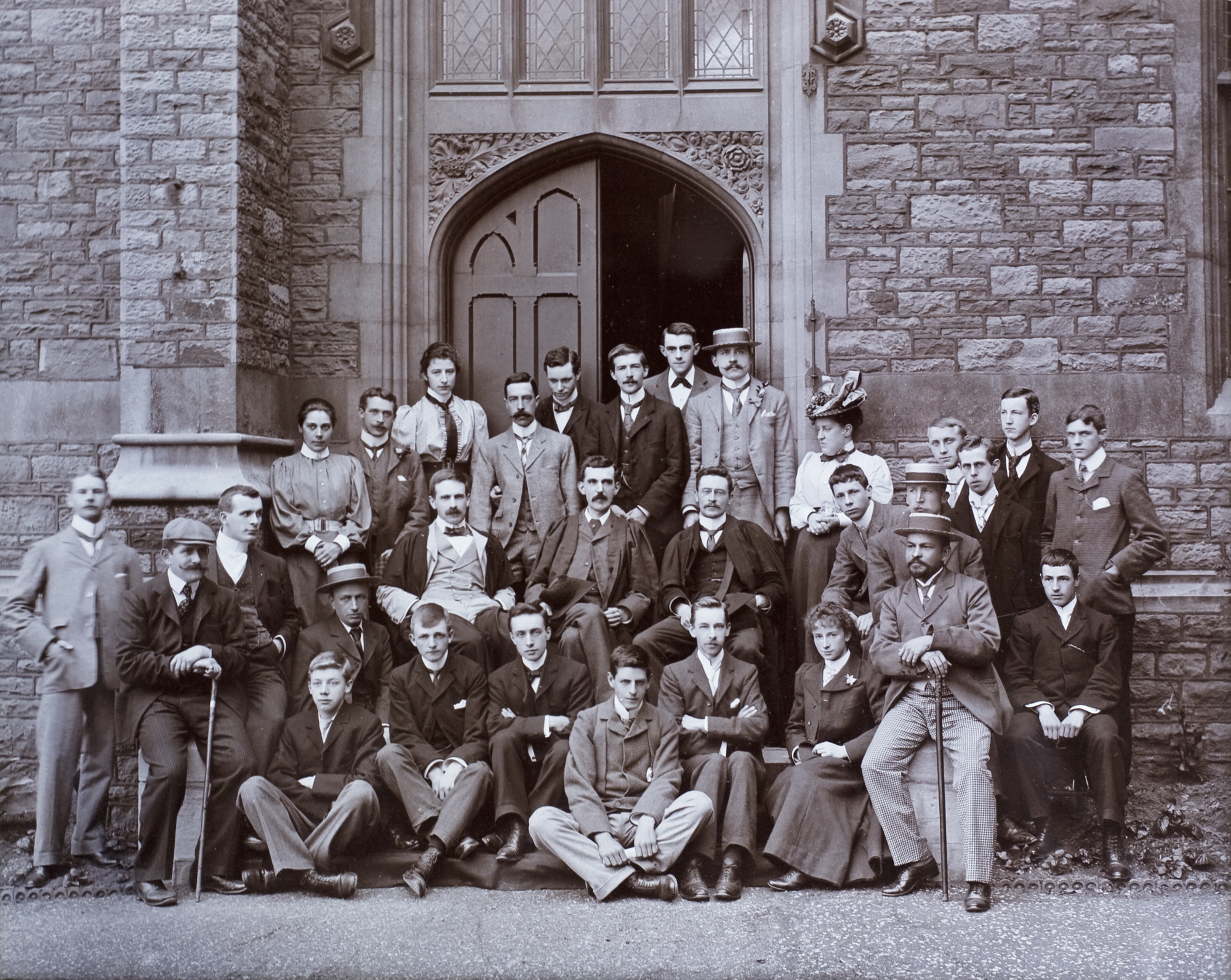
Chemistry Department staff and students, University College Bristol, 1898-1899

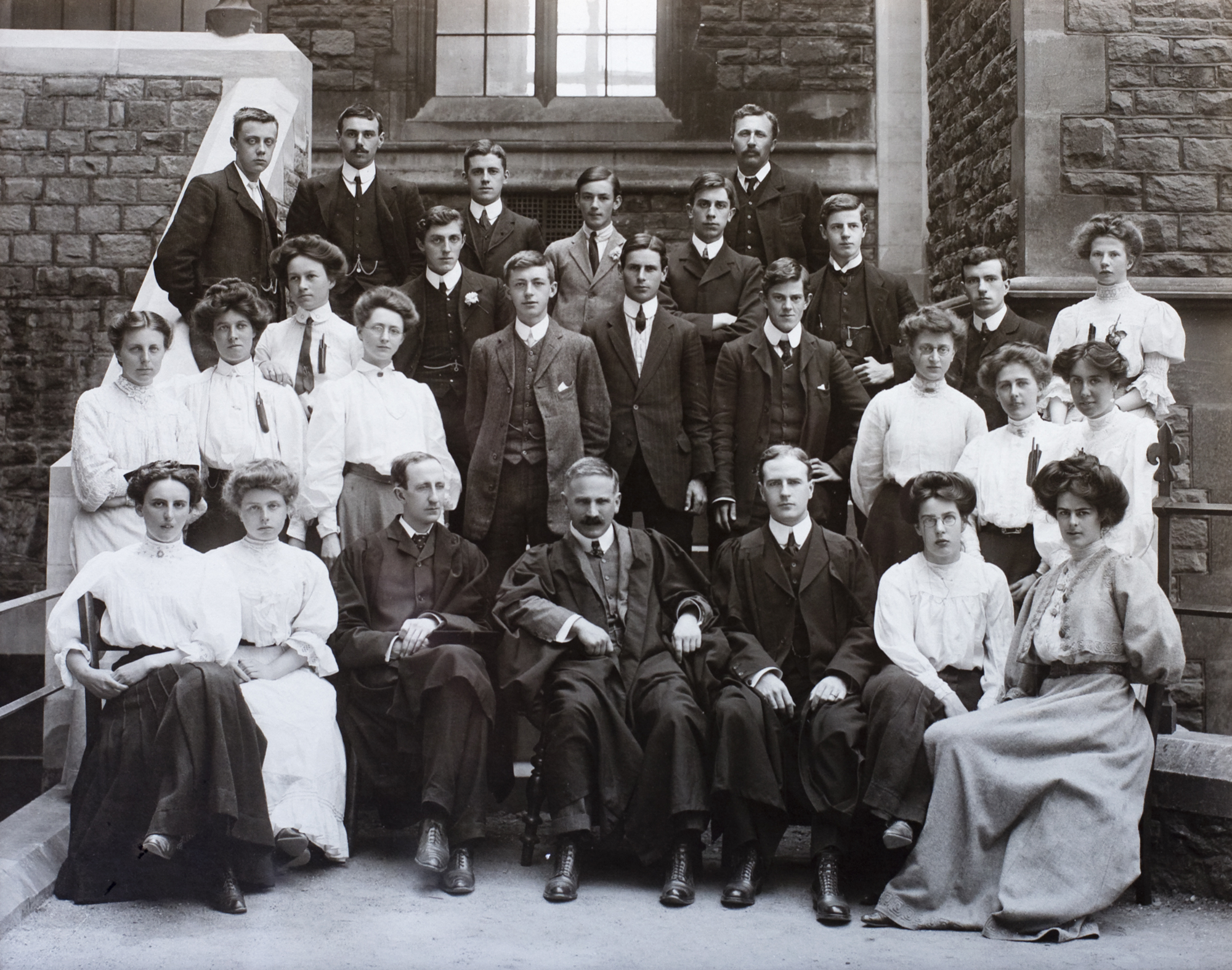
Chemistry Department staff and students, University College Bristol, 1907-1908
