= Sydney Young (chemist) =

English chemist

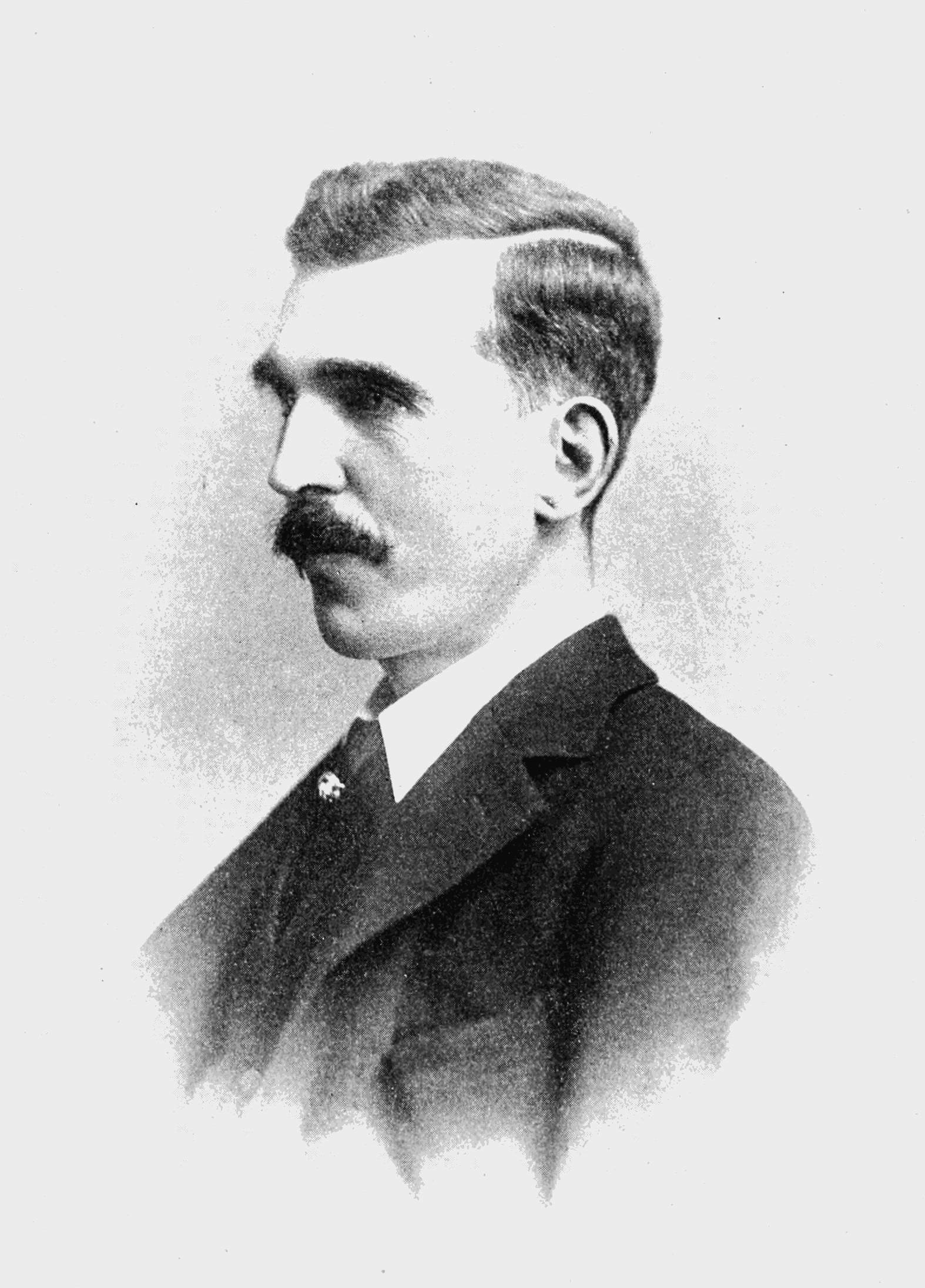
Sydney Young

Sydney Young, FRS (29 December 1857 – 9 April 1937) was an English chemist.

He was born in Farnworth, in Widnes, Lancashire, the son of merchant Edward Young, JP of Liverpool. He was educated at a private school in Southport and the Liverpool Royal Institution school. In 1877, after two years working with his father, he entered Owens College, Manchester, to study chemistry. He was awarded B.Sc. in 1880 and the degree of D.Sc. three years later, while working with William Ramsay at University College, Bristol. There he was involved in the founding of the Chemical Society in 1880.

In 1882 he was appointed lecturer and demonstrator of Chemistry under Ramsay at University College, Bristol. and succeeded Ramsay as Professor of Chemistry when the latter moved to University College London. In 1904 he became Professor of Chemistry at Trinity College, Dublin retiring from the chair in 1928.

In 1893 he was elected a Fellow of the Royal Society. His membership application citation read "Professor of Chemistry, University College, Bristol. Well known as a scientific chemist. Author of numerous papers on Organic and Inorganic Chemistry, and on the border-land of Physics and Chemistry. Among these are: - 'Alkyl Fluorides;' 'Ethyl valerolactone;' 'Vapour-Pressures and Specific Volumes of Halogen Compounds in relation to the Periodic Law;' 'A New Method of determining Specific Volumes of Liquids and Saturated Vapours;' 'The Molecular Volumes of the Saturated Vapours of Benzene, and of its Halogen Derivatives.' Dr Young is also the joint author of numerous memoirs on the thermal properties of liquids, and allied subjects, several of which have appeared in full in the Philosophical Transactions"

He was also a Member of the Royal Irish Academy, serving as their president from 1921 to 1926.

Young married Grace Martha Kimmins, with whom he had twin sons. One was killed in the First World War and the other, Charles Edgar, became headmaster of Rossall School.
