= Katherine Alice Burke =

British chemist (1875–1924)

- Born: 1875; Surrey, England
- Died: 6 July 1924 (aged 48–49)
- Education: Birkbeck College, London
- Known for: The absorption spectra of the nitrates in relation to the ionic theory; Signatory of the 1904 petition to the Chemical Society
- Scientific career
- Fields: Chemistry
- Workplaces: University College, London

Katherine Alice Burke (1875 – 6 July 1924) was a British chemist and one of the nineteen signatories of the 1904 petition to the Chemical Society.

== Early life and education ==
Burke was born in Surrey in 1875. She obtained her BSc. degree from her studies at Bedford College and later Birkbeck, University of London. She graduated in 1899.

== Career ==
Burke transferred from Birkbeck to University College, London, to work under Frederick Donnan, in the laboratory of noted Scottish chemist, William Ramsay, a strong supporter of the rights of women chemists. Burke also collaborated with Ramsay in his work on the radioactive elements.

While at University College, Burke also worked with Fellow of the Royal Society, Edward Charles Cyril Baly and his co-author on six papers Effie Marsden, on studies relating absorption spectra to chemical constitution. Burke and Marsden co-authored a paper, and she had one publication with Baly and two with Donnan.

Burke acted as a private research assistant to Ramsay and translated a book by Danish chemist, Julius Thomsen, on systematic researches in thermochemistry into English as part of her work. This translation appeared in print in 1905.

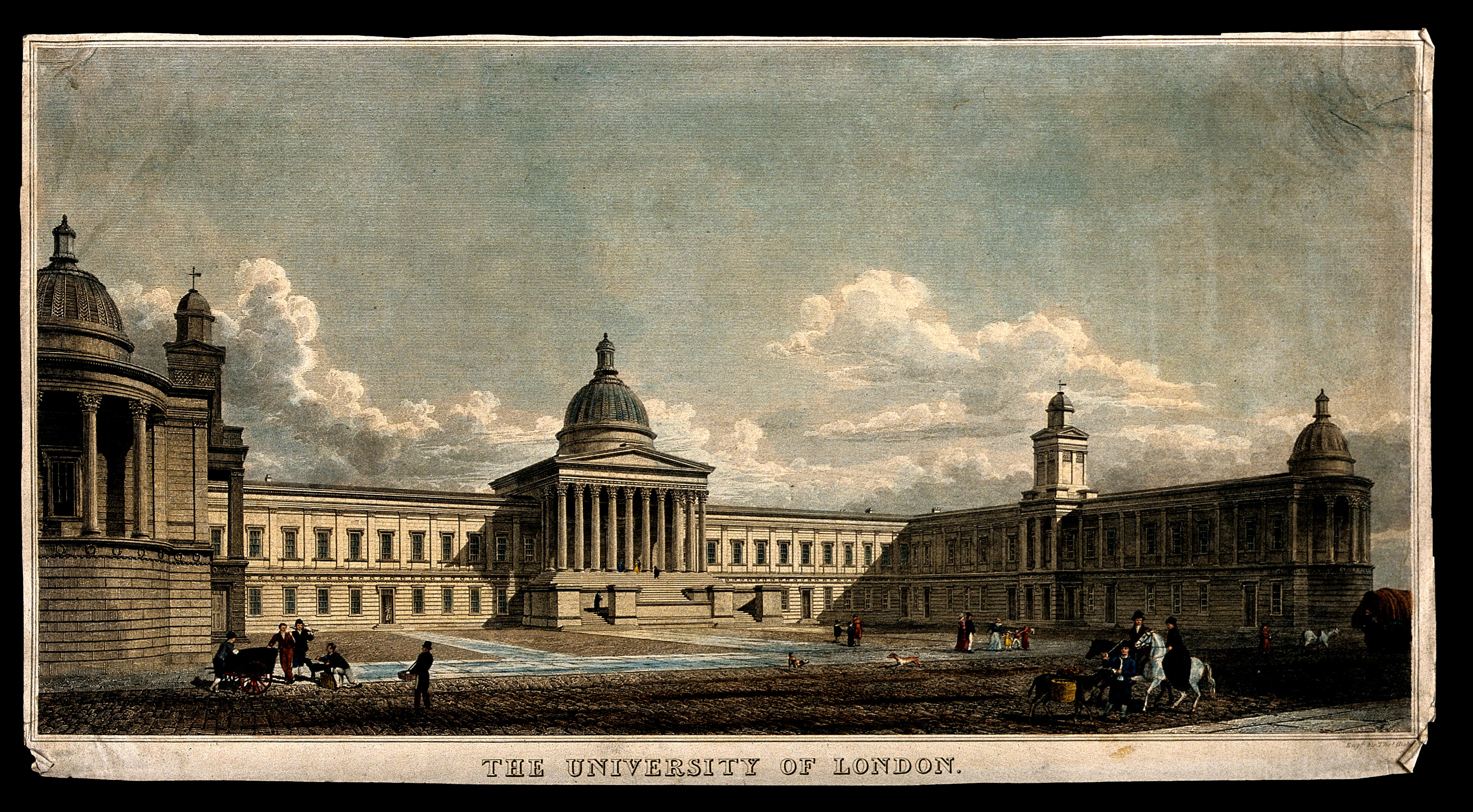
University College, London

In 1906, Burke was appointed a member of staff as Assistant in the Department of Chemistry. By 1921, she had been promoted to Assistant Lecturer.

== 1904 petition to the Chemical Society ==
In 1904, perhaps at Ramsay's suggestion, Burke, along with 18 other British women chemists, signed a petition setting out their reasons to the Chemical Society why they should be afforded Fellowship status like their male counterparts. The petition eventually led to the admission of women as Fellows of the Society (one of the Societies that amalgamated to become the Royal Society of Chemistry), as well as identifying prominent female chemists working in Britain at this time.

Burke also signed the 1909 letter to the Chemical News along with Effie Marsden and Maud Gazdar.

== Death ==
Burke died on 6 July 1924. Her colleague, the Irish scientist Frederick Donnan recorded in her obituary:

"In 1906, she was appointed a member of the Chemical Staff at University College, and from that time until her death on July 6th, 1924, she continued her teaching work, having charge of the practical laboratory work for students of the Intermediate Science class, and giving courses of lectures to more advanced students on the chemical aspects of radioactive transformations."
