= Alice Emily Smith =

British chemist (1871–1924)

- Born: 18 June 1871
- Died: 1924 (aged 52–53)
- Education: University of North Wales, Bangor, Gwynedd
- Known for: Signatory of the 1904 petition to the Chemical Society.
- Scientific career
- Fields: Chemistry
- Workplaces: University College of North Wales, Bangor, Gwynedd Owens College, Manchester

Alice Emily Smith (18 June 1871 – 1924) was a British chemist and one of the nineteen signatories of the 1904 petition to the Chemical Society.

== Early life and education ==
Smith was born 18 June 1871, the daughter of Thomas Smith, Commission Agent from County Down, Northern Ireland.

She was educated at Crescent House school in Bedford. She matriculated at the University College of North Wales in 1897 and graduated with a B.Sc. (London) in 1901 before taking up work as a demonstrator there.

Smith was awarded an 1851 exhibition scholarship and chose to use it to conduct research at Owens College, Manchester from 1901 to 1903. Whilst at Owens College, she worked with both William Henry Perkin Jr. and K. J. P. Orton.

Smith's research with Perkins resulted in four important research papers being published on structure determinations and new synthetic routes in organic chemistry between 1902 and 1904.

== Career ==
In 1903, Smith returned to the University College of North Wales as an Assistant Lecturer in Organic Chemistry and Assistant Lecturer in Education. During this period, Smith was one of only five women chemists to receive Chemical Society Research Fund grants between 1902 and 1910.

While working at Bangor, she collaborated with Head of Chemistry, Professor Kennedy J.P. Orton, on a study of reaction mechanisms from 1905 to 1908 which resulted in the publishing of five research papers. Orton was a strong supporter of the rights of women chemists so may have made Smith aware of the 1904 petition to the Chemical Society.

== The 1904 petition to the Chemical Society ==
In 1904, Smith, along with eighteen other British women chemists, signed a petition setting out their reasons to the Chemical Society why they should be afforded Fellowship status like their male counterparts. The petition eventually led to the admission of women as Fellows of the Society (one of the Societies that amalgamated to become the Royal Society of Chemistry), as well as identifying prominent female chemists working in Britain at this time.

== Later life ==
In 1914, Smith gave up her position at University College and took up a new role as lecturer in Science at the Maria Grey Training College in London, the first teachers' training college for women. In 1917, she left the college to become a research chemist at Cooper's Laboratory. In 1920, she returned to teaching, becoming head of Heathfield Boarding School for Girls, a private school at Ilkley, West Yorkshire. She ran the school with Margaret Raad until they dissolved their business partnership on 25 July 1923. On Christmas Day 1923, Smith was declared bankrupt with estimated debts of nearly £4,700 (equivalent to £246,000 in 2025). She died in the following year.
