= Elizabeth Eleanor Field =

British chemist

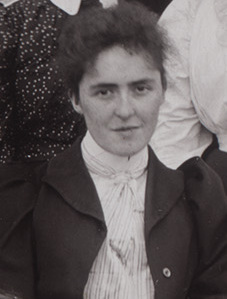
- Field c.1899 at Royal Holloway College
- Citizenship: British
- Education: Newnham College, Cambridge
- Known for: chemist and educator Signatory to 1904 petition to grant Fellowship status to women chemists
- Scientific career
- Fields: Chemistry
- Workplaces: Newnham College, Cambridge Royal Holloway College.

Elizabeth Eleanor Field was a British chemist and the Head of Chemistry at Royal Holloway College for two decades. She is also noted as one of the nineteen signatories of the 1904 petition which aimed to grant women the status of Fellows of the Chemical Society.

== Education ==
Field graduated from Newnham College, Cambridge, in 1887 and worked as Assistant Demonstrator in Chemistry from 1889 to 1890. She undertook research under Matthew Moncrieff Pattison Muir as part of her Bathurst studentship from 1891 to 1893.

== Career ==
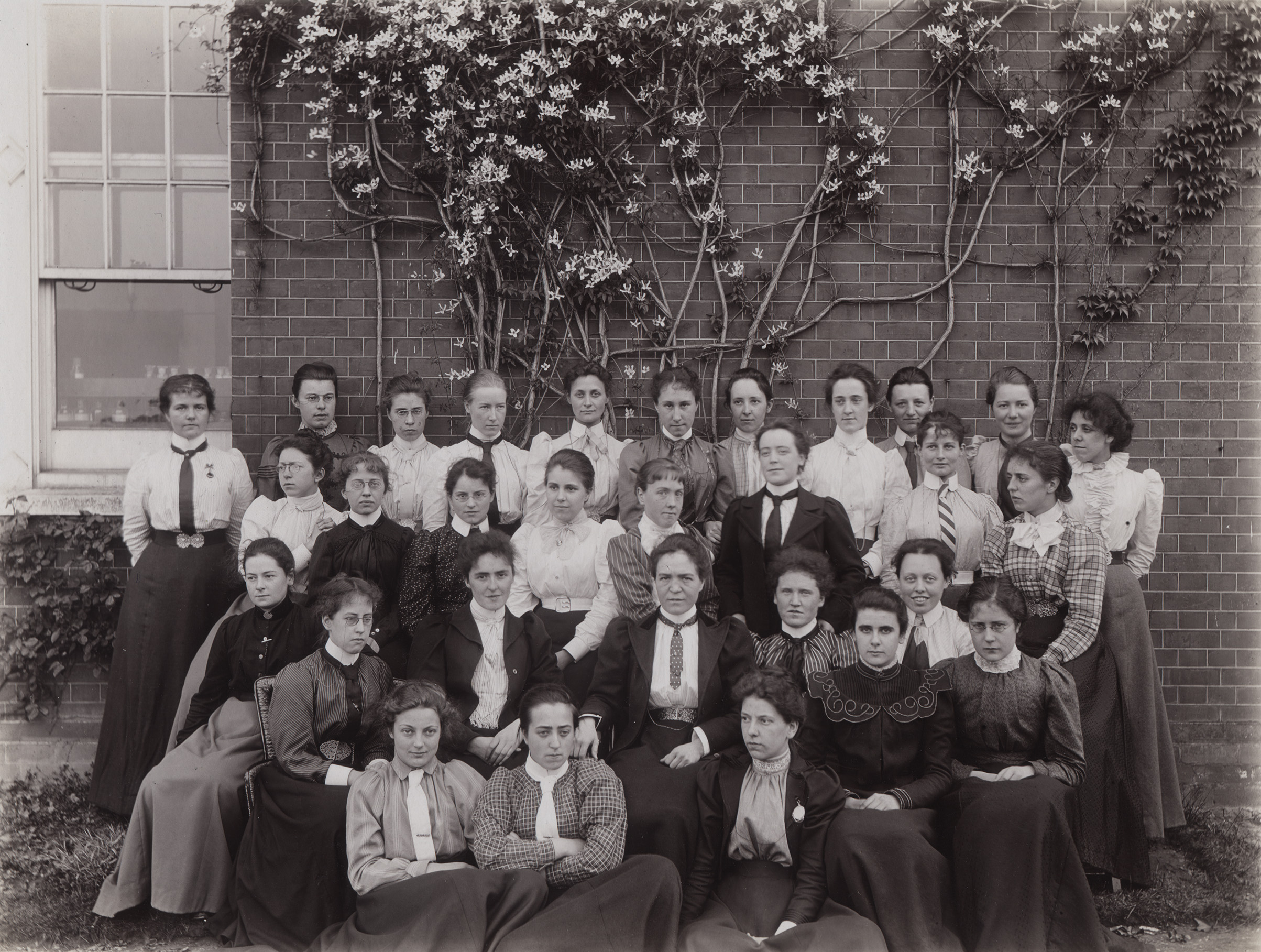
Chemistry staff and students c.1899 at the Royal Holloway College, University of London

Field left Cambridge to work for two years as assistant mistress (teacher) at Liverpool College for Girls from 1893 to 1895 before taking up the role of Lecturer and Head of Chemistry at the Royal Holloway College where she remained for the next nineteen years until 1913.

== The 1904 petition ==
Female heads of department at Royal Holloway College were given the title of Senior Staff Lecturer while their male counterparts were titled Professor.

In 1904, Field, along with eighteen other British women chemists, signed a petition setting out their reasons to the Chemical Society why they should be afforded Fellowship status like their male counterparts. The petition eventually led to the admission of women as Fellows of the Society (one of the Societies that amalgamated to become the Royal Society of Chemistry), as well as identifying prominent female chemists working in Britain at this time.

Mildred Gostling, was another of the notable names on the list of petition signatories. She obtained her degree from Royal Holloway College in 1897 so is almost certainly to have been taught by Field.
