= Margaret Seward (chemist) =

British chemist (1864–1929)

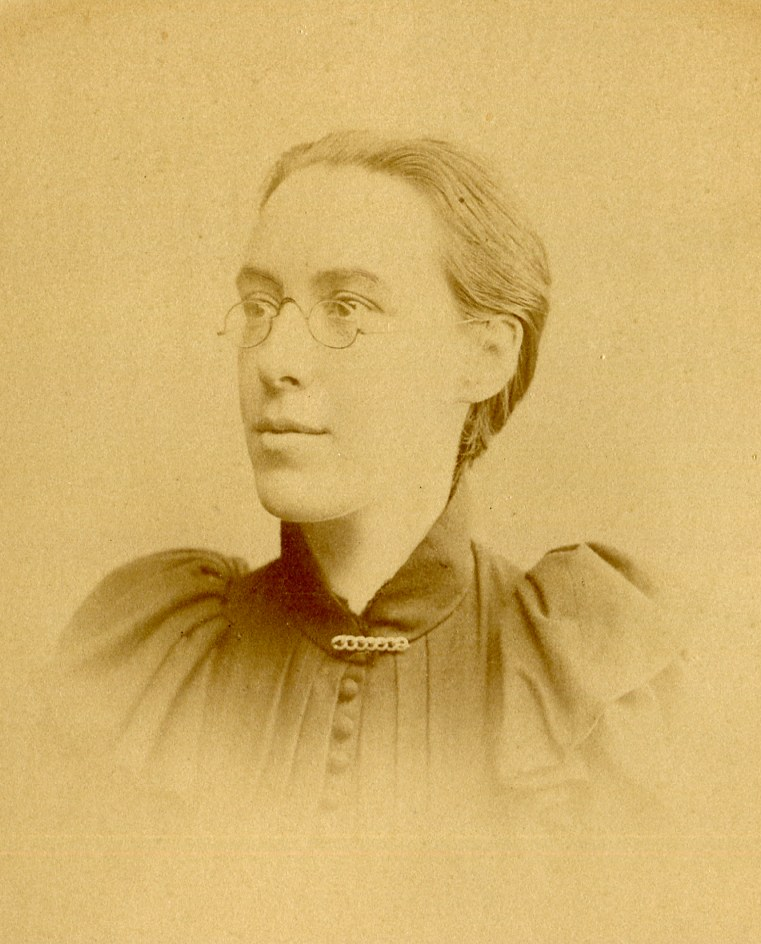
- Margaret Seward at Somerville College in 1885
- Born: January 22, 1864; Wigan, Lancashire, England
- Died: May 29, 1929 (aged 65); Chiswick, London, England
- Education: Blackburne House; Somerville Hall, University of Oxford
- Occupations: Chemist, nutritionist
- Spouse: John McKillop (m. 1891)
- Scientific career
- Workplaces: Royal Holloway College; Roedean School; King's College London

Margaret Seward MBE (22 January 1864 – 29 May 1929) became the earliest Chemist on staff at the Women's College (of which she was a founding Lecturer), from 1896 to 1915. She became the pioneer woman to obtain a first class in the honour school of Natural Science and later received an MBE for her work on nutrition during World War I.

== Early life and education ==
Margaret Seward was born on 22 January 1864 in Wigan, Lancashire. Her father was James Seward, a schoolmaster at the Liverpool Institute, and her mother was Sarah Jane Seward (née Woodgates). She was educated at Blackburne House, Liverpool.

Seward entered Somerville College, Oxford, in 1881, and was the recipient of the Reinagle scholarship. She was one of the first two female chemistry students, the other one being Mary Watson. In 1884, she was the first Oxford female student to be entered for the honour school of Mathematics. Seward then changed her focus to Chemistry, and in 1885 became the pioneer woman to obtain the first class honour school of Natural Science.

== Career ==
Upon graduation, Seward was immediately appointed Natural Science tutor and chaperone at Somerville, in addition to undertaking research with the Oxford chemist, William H. Pendlebury. Two publications on chemical reactions resulted from her work, one of which was read to the Royal Society in 1889. These were a study on the reaction kinetics between hydrogen chloride and potassium chlorate and a study of this reaction in the presence of iodide ions.

Seward was appointed as lecturer in Chemistry at Royal Holloway College (RHC) in 1887, where she taught Martha Annie Whiteley. She resigned in 1891 to travel to Singapore to marry John McKillop, a civil engineer. They had one son together, Alasdair.

When she returned to Britain in 1893, McKillop taught at several institutions including the Girl's Grammar School, Bradford and Rodean School. In 1895 she was appointed to King's College London, Women's Department, in 1896 to teach chemistry in the new chemical laboratory. She was the earliest chemist on the staff.

In 1904, McKillop was a signatory of the 1904 petition to the Chemical Society, petitioning for women's equality in chemistry. She wrote Economics: Descriptive and Theoretical (1911), an undergraduate textbook, with fellow King's College lecturer Mabel Atkinson.

McKillop was described there as "one of the foremost women science-lecturers", but in 1912, King's College decided to appoint a male lecturer, and she was reassigned to library work. McKillop's position was terminated in 1914.

During World War I, McKillop worked in the Ministry of Food and wrote the book Food Values, What They Are and How to Calculate Them. She was awarded an MBE in 1919 for her wartime studies on nutrition. In April 1924 she gave a series of talks on "The family budget on a weekly wage."

== Political activity ==
Margaret Seward McKillop joined the Fabian Society in 1894 and was a leading figure in its Women's Group, serving as chair for several years.

== Death ==
McKillop died on 29 May 1929 at St Mary's Nursing Home, Chiswick.
