= Alice E. Smith (historian) =

American historian (1896–1992)

Director of research of the Wisconsin Historical Society
- In office 1947–1965

Personal details
- Born: April 1, 1896 Grantsburg, Wisconsin, U.S.
- Died: April 15, 1992 (aged 96)
- Occupation: Historian
- Awards: Guggenheim Fellowship (1957)

Academic background
- Education: University of Minnesota

Academic work
- Sub-discipline: History of Wisconsin
- Institutions: Wisconsin Historical Society

Alice Elizabeth Smith (April 1, 1896 – April 15, 1992) was an American historian. She joined the Wisconsin Historical Society in 1929 and served as their director of research from 1947 until 1965. She was a 1957 Guggenheim Fellow and wrote several books related to the history of Wisconsin.

== Biography ==
Alice Elizabeth Smith was born on April 1, 1896, in Grantsburg, Wisconsin. She attended the University of Minnesota, where she obtained her BA in 1923, worked as a teaching assistant in European history from 1924 to 1926, and obtained her MA in 1926.

Smith worked at the Minnesota Historical Society as a research assistant (1926-1927 and 1928-1929), as well as at the University of Minnesota Press as an editorial assistant (1927-1928). She joined the Wisconsin Historical Society in 1929 as a manuscript curator. After working as a 1946-1947 Rockefeller Foundation Fellow, she returned to the WHS as director of research in 1947. In 1951, she was a special lecturer at the University of Wisconsin Library School. In 1965, she retired from her role as director of research.

Smith wrote six books related to the history of Wisconsin, including Guide to the Manuscripts of the Wisconsin Historical Society (1944), James Duane Doty: Frontier Promoter (1954), (Note: Reviews of this book:) George Smith's Money: A Scottish Investor in America (1966), (Note: Reviews of this book:) Millstone and Saw: The Origins of Neenah-Menasha (1966), (Note: Reviews of this book:) and the first volume of The History of Wisconsin (1973). (Note: Reviews of this book:) She edited two volumes of The Journals of Welcome Arnold Greene: Journeys in the South, 1822-1824 in 1956 and 1957, the first one with Howard Greene. In 1957, Smith was awarded a Guggenheim Fellowship "for a study of Scottish leadership and capital in the development of the lower Lake Michigan area in the 19th century".

Smith died on April 15, 1992. The Midwestern History Association's Alice Smith Prize in Public History is named after her, as is the WHS' Alice E. Smith Fellowship.

== Works ==
- James Duane Doty: Frontier Promoter (1954)
- The Journals of Welcome Arnold Greene: Journeys in the South, 1822-1824
- George Smith's Money: A Scottish Investor in America (1966)
- Millstone and Saw: The Origins of Neenah-Menasha (1966)
- The History of Wisconsin: Volume I (1973)
