= Alice E. Smith =

American industrial engineer

Alice E. Smith Ph.D., P.E.
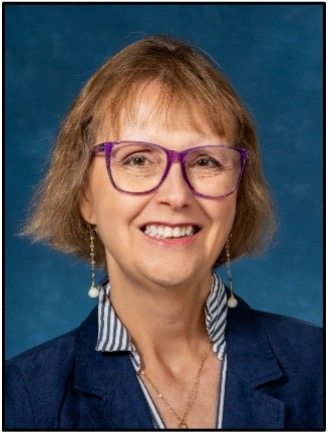
- Occupations: Professor of Mechanical Engineering and Computer Science
- Title: Endowed Shelby Distinguished Professor Department of Mechanical Engineering and Department of Computer Science, University of Alabama
- Board member of: Editor-in-Chief, INFORMS Journal on Computing; Area Editor, Computers & Operations Research
- Awards: Member, National Academy of Engineering (2025); Life Fellow, Institute of Electrical and Electronics Engineers; Fellow, Institute for Operations Research and the Management Sciences; Fellow, Institute of Industrial and Systems Engineers; Yellowhammer Women of Impact (2020); Auburn University 100 Women Strong Leadership in Diversity Faculty Award (2017); Wellington Award (2016); Albert G. Holzman Distinguished Educator Award (2012); WORMS Award for the Advancement of Women in OR/MS (2009); E. L. Grant Best Paper Awards (1999, 2006); William A. J. Golomski Best Paper Award (2002)

Academic background
- Education: B.S.C.E., Rice University; M.B.A., Saint Louis University; Ph.D., Missouri University of Science and Technology; B.A. in Spanish, Auburn University
- Alma mater: Missouri University of Science and Technology (Ph.D.)

Academic work
- Discipline: Industrial and systems engineering
- Institutions: The University of Alabama; Auburn University; University of Pittsburgh; Southwestern Bell Corporation
- Main interests: Analysis, modeling, and optimization of complex systems; nature-inspired computation

Alice E. Smith is an American industrial engineer whose research concerns analysis, modeling, and mathematical optimization of complex systems in manufacturing, business planning, advanced materials, and communication networks, with an emphasis on nature-inspired computation with operations research and statistical methods. In 2025 she was elected to the National Academy of Engineering for advancements in computational intelligence applied to modeling and optimization of complex systems. She is the Endowed Shelby Distinguished Professor for both the Mechanical Engineering and Computer Science departments at the University of Alabama at Tuscaloosa.

== Education ==
Smith earned a B.S.C.E from Rice University, where she majored in civil engineering, and an MBA from Saint Louis University (1988). She completed her Ph.D. in engineering management and systems engineering at Missouri University of Science and Technology (1991) and later earned a B.A. in Spanish from Auburn University.

== Career ==
From 1979 to 1989 Smith worked at Southwestern Bell Corporation as an engineer and engineering manager. She joined the University of Pittsburgh faculty in 1991 (assistant professor; associate professor in 1996). In 1999 she moved to Auburn University as professor and chair of Industrial and Systems Engineering (1999–2011). Her endowed positions at Auburn include Philpott–WestPoint Stevens Professor (2001), W. Allen and Martha Reed Professor (2012), Joe W. Forehand/Accenture Distinguished Professor (2015), and Joe W. Forehand, Jr. Distinguished Professor (2023). During her chair tenure the department saw significant growth in enrollment, research funding, private support, facilities, and national ranking. Since 2026, she is also an Endowed Shelby Distinguished Professor for both the Mechanical Engineering and Computer Science departments at the University of Alabama at Tuscaloosa.

== Research and Publications ==
Smith's work spans mathematical optimization and computational intelligence for complex, constrained engineering systems. She holds one U.S. patent (with additional international patents) and has authored publications with over 19,000 citations, an h-index of 55, and an i10-index of 146 (Google Scholar). She appears in the Stanford “top 2%” scientist impact list. Several of her papers are among the most-cited in their journals, including the most-cited paper in Reliability Engineering & System Safety, a top-cited paper in IEEE Transactions on Reliability, and the most-cited paper in The Engineering Economist. She is Editor-in-Chief of the INFORMS Journal on Computing and an Area Editor for Computers & Operations ResearchComputers & Operations Research.

== Grants and Collaborations ==
Smith has served as principal investigator on over $12 million in sponsored research from agencies including the U.S. National Science Foundation (18 distinct awards, including a CAREER award and an ADVANCE Leadership grant), the Department of Homeland Security, NASA, the U.S. Department of Defense (including the Missile Defense Agency), the National Security Agency, NIST, and the U.S. Department of Transportation, with industry partners such as Toyota, Ford, and Lockheed Martin. International collaborations have been supported by organizations in Europe, the Americas, the Middle East, and Asia. She is a four-time Fulbright Scholar (2013, 2016, 2017, 2020) with residencies in Turkey, Chile, and Colombia.

== Awards and honors ==
Smith was named a Fellow of the Institute of Industrial and Systems Engineers (2003) and a Fellow of INFORMS (2021). In 2025 she was elected to the National Academy of Engineering. Other honors include the WORMS Award for the Advancement of Women in OR/MS (2009), the Albert G. Holzman Distinguished Educator Award (2012), the Wellington Award of the IISE Engineering Economy Division (2016), the Yellowhammer Women of Impact recognition (2020), and the inaugural Auburn University 100 Women Strong Leadership in Diversity Faculty Award (2017). Earlier research prizes include the E. L. Grant Best Paper Awards (1999, 2006) and the William A. J. Golomski Best Paper Award (2002).

== Professional Service and Leadership ==
Smith is a Life Fellow of the IEEE, a Fellow of INFORMS and IISE, a senior member of the Society of Women Engineers, a member of Tau Beta Pi, and a Registered Professional Engineer. She is an IEEE Distinguished Lecturer and an INFORMS Official Speaker. Her leadership roles include Chair of the Council of Industrial Engineering Academic Department Heads, President of the INFORMS Association of Chairs of OR Departments, and INFORMS Diversity, Equity, and Inclusion Ambassador (2021).
