= Ida Freund =

Austrian-British chemist

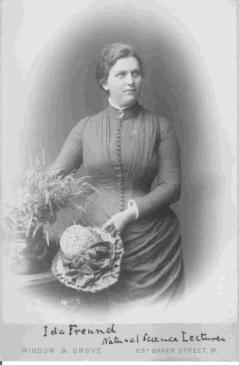
- Born: 5 April 1863; Austria
- Died: 15 May 1914 (aged 51); Cambridge, England
- Education: University of Cambridge (BA)
- Occupation: Chemistry lecturer
- Known for: Science education
- Notable work: The Study of Chemical Composition (1904); The Experimental Basis of Chemistry (1920)

Ida Freund (5 April 1863 – 15 May 1914) was the first woman to be a university chemistry lecturer in the United Kingdom. She is known for her influence on science teaching, particularly the teaching of women and girls. She wrote two key chemistry textbooks and invented the idea of baking periodic table cupcakes, as well as inventing a gas measuring tube, which was named after her.

== Biography ==
Ida Freund was born in the Austrian Empire. Following the death of her mother, she moved to live with her grandparents in Vienna. In 1881 her grandparents died, and she moved to England to live with her uncle and guardian, the violinist Ludwig Straus well known as a member of the Joachim Quartet and leader of the Hallé Orchestra (1875–88). She enrolled in Girton College, achieving a first class honours in the Natural Sciences Tripos course despite having previously had only school level English language skills. She went on to Cambridge Training College for Women as a chemistry lecturer, and one year later joined Newnham College, Cambridge, as a demonstrator. In 1890, she was promoted to staff lecturer in chemistry (1893–1912). This was the first appointment of a woman as a full lecturer in the subject in the UK. She was an associate at Newnham College and then a member of its council.

Her focus on teaching left her little time for research, she did not pursue a master's degree or a doctorate. She was responsible for the laboratory training of her students, many of whom came up to College with little or no knowledge of chemistry. Amongst her students, she was thought to be an inspirational teacher and a singular character. She had lost a leg in a cycling accident when she was a girl and used variously walking sticks, a prosthetic leg and a three-wheeled tricycle wheelchair worked with her arms. Her disability and unconventional style of dress made her a distinctive figure, which was much remarked upon at the time by colleagues and contemporaries.

Freund was an active feminist and supporter of women's suffrage. She was amongst the women who fought for admission to the Chemical Society in the early 1900s. Women were eventually admitted to the Society in 1920, six years after her death. She remained at Newnham until her retirement due to ill-health in 1913. The chemistry lab at Newnham was closed following her retirement because by that time female students were admitted to study in departmental chemistry labs in the university. She died on 15 May 1914 following surgery at her home in Cambridge while working on her second book.

== Publications ==
Freund published one paper entitled "The effect of temperature on the volume change accompanying neutralization in the case of a number of salts at different concentrations" and two chemistry textbooks. The Study of Chemical Composition: An Account of its Method and Historical Development with Illustrative Quotations (1904) (reprinted in 2014.) and The Experimental Basis of Chemistry: Suggestions for a Series of Experiments Illustrative of the Fundamental Principles of Chemistry published posthumously in 1920. She had planned that the book should be 20 chapters but had only completed ten chapters at her death. The book was later edited for publication by colleagues and friends, including Mary Beatrice Thomas, Director of Science Studies at Girton College.

In the preface for the book, editors A. Hutchinson and Mary Beatrice Thomas suggest that in writing it: "Miss Freund was attempting to bring to the notice of other teachers her views as to the manner in which students may be helped to realise that chemistry is a science-based on experiment, and that logical interpretation of experiments leads directly to the generalisation known as the laws of chemistry."

Both of Freund's books are considered to be key texts in the teaching of chemistry and are much cited.

== Teaching ==
Freund is known for her interest in science education, and in particular for improving science teaching in girls' schools. At the time, in Cambridge, women could not work in the same laboratories as men so Freund taught special classes in the Chemistry labs at Newnham College. She also wrote textbooks and organised holiday workshops for women teachers. Freund experimented with different teaching techniques, favouring Wilhelm Ostwald's approach, in which "[t]he main facts of chemistry are dealt with in the form of a dialogue between a teacher and a pupil". She insisted that her students read original research and test the validity of published work – a revolutionary approach for the time, for which she was criticised. However, she had a significant influence on the teaching techniques of the time and was much loved by her students

Hutchinson and Thomas, the editors of her posthumously published textbook The Fundamental Principles of Chemistry, described her teaching ethos thus "Miss Freund had a dread of thoughtless experimenting and slipshod thinking. She felt strongly that much that passes for training in science has little relation to scientific method and is of small educational value." They quote her as saying, " I aimed at giving by means of class teaching not only a common ground of knowledge but also a common standard concerning the nature of scientific proof and the meaning of real accuracy".

She opposed the introduction of domestic science teaching in girls' schools as a substitute for fundamental scientific education but made use of her own baking and culinary skills to create engaging teaching resources.

== Periodic table cupcakes ==
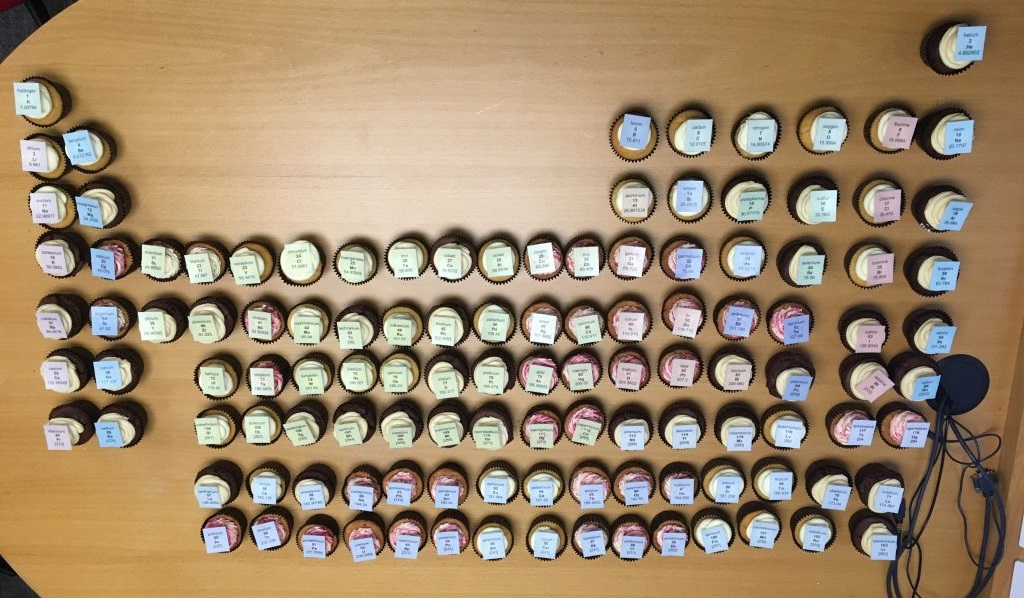
Periodic Table cupcakes, made in 2017

Freund was the first person to bake a set of periodic table cupcakes. She used them as teaching aids in her classroom. She created boxes of chocolates with pictures of scientists and a large periodic table with each element represented by a cupcake decorated with its name and atomic number in icing.

One of her students described her approach:

In my year we were requested to go and make a further study of the 'Periodic Table of the Elements.' We found a very large board with the Table set out. The divisions across and down were made with Edinburgh Rock, numbers were made of chocolate, and the elements were iced cakes each showing its name and atomic weight in icing. The nonvalent atoms were round, univalent had a protruding corner, bivalent two, trivalent triangular and so on. We divided it up between us!

Based on her original idea, periodic table cupcakes have become a popular way to celebrate chemistry at school bake sales and events aiming to promote public engagement with science. The Royal Society of Chemistry celebrated the launch of the Visual Elements Periodic Table with a set of periodic table cupcakes and students at Nottingham University did similarly for the birthday of Martyn Poliakoff. A video showing the collection of cakes is included in Professor Poliakoff's series of online videos 'Periodic Videos' Periodic Videos aim to bring chemistry to a new generation of students.

Recipe instructions for modern versions of Freund's periodic table of cupcakes are available from a variety of sources online.

== Inventions ==
As well as inventing periodic table cupcakes, Freund also had a piece of laboratory apparatus (a gas measuring tube) named after her as her invention. The apparatus is no longer in common use.

== Memorials ==
In April 1998 the lab at Newnham was restored as a memorial. The Ida Freund Memorial Fund was set up to raise the standard of women teachers in the physical sciences by giving them opportunities for further study. The Ida Freund Memorial Prize is offered by Newnham College. Furthermore, Girton College awards the Ida Freund Prize to its students of physical sciences for first-class academic achievements.

== See also ==
- Timeline of women in science
