= Ida Maclean =

English biochemist

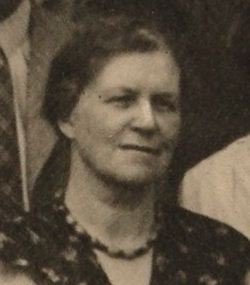
- Ida Maclean-Smedley (1933)
- Born: Ida Smedley; 14 June 1877; Birmingham, England
- Died: 2 March 1944 (aged 66); London, England
- Known for: First woman admitted to the London Chemical Society
- Scientific career
- Fields: Biochemistry

Ida Maclean (nee Smedley; 14 June 1877 – 2 March 1944) was an English biochemist and the first woman admitted to the London Chemical Society.

== Early life and education ==
Ida was born in Birmingham to William Smedley, a businessman, and Annie Elizabeth Duckworth. She was taught by her mother at home until the age of nine and lived in "a cultured and progressive home". She was educated at King Edward VI High School for Girls, Birmingham from 1886 to 1896, when she won a scholarship and began her studies at Newnham College, Cambridge. In the university's Natural Sciences Tripos she got a first class in part one and a second class in part two, studying chemistry and physiology. After a two-year break, holding a Bathurst scholarship, in 1901 she undertook postgraduate research at the Central Technical College in London and later at the Royal Institution's Davy-Faraday Research Laboratory. The University of London awarded her a D.Sc. in 1905.

== Academic career ==
In 1906 Maclean became an assistant lecturer in at the chemistry department of Manchester University, the department's first woman staff member. She taught there until 1910, as well as acting as a demonstrator in the women students' laboratories and researching the optical properties of organic compounds. In 1910, supported by one of the first Beit fellowships, she began her work in biochemistry at the Lister Institute of Preventive Medicine, receiving the American Association of University Women's Ellen Richards prize for her research. She married Hugh Maclean, a co-worker at the Lister Institute, on 28 March 1913; the couple had a son and a daughter. During World War I she worked at the Admiralty in areas such as gas warfare and the large-scale production of acetone by fermentation.

Between 1920 and 1941 Maclean published in the Biochemical Journal approximately thirty papers, many in collaboration, on her particular interests, namely the role of fatty acids in animals and the synthesis of fats from carbohydrates. In 1927 she co-authored with Hugh the second edition of his book The Lipins. She came to be regarded as an authority on biochemistry, and her 1943 monograph The Metabolism of Fat was the first published of Methuen's series Monographs on Biochemical Subjects.

== Women's rights ==
Maclean worked hard to improve the status of women in universities and was among the founders of the British Federation of University Women in 1907. Having been made a fellow of the Royal Institute of Chemistry in 1918, in 1920 she became the first woman to be formally admitted to the London Chemical Society. From 1931 to 1934 she was on the council of the London Chemical Society and from 1929 to 1935 she was president of the British Federation of University Women, which later named a research fellowship for women after her. From 1941 to 1944 she was on the women's appointments board of the University of Cambridge.

== Death ==
She died on 2 March 1944 at University College Hospital in London. Her body was cremated.

== See also ==
- Timeline of women in science
