= 1928 All-Ireland Senior Football Championship final =

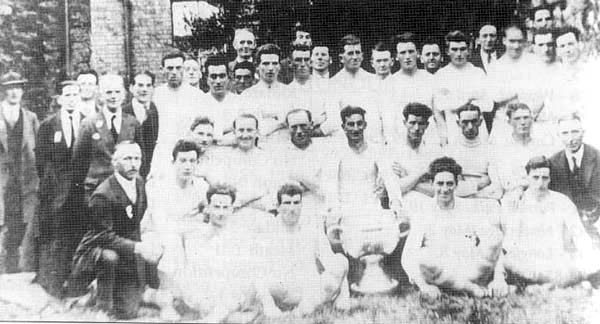
- Kildare, champions
- Event: 1928 All-Ireland Senior Football Championship
Kildare	Cavan
2–6 (12)	2–5 (11)
- Date: 30 September 1928
- Venue: Croke Park, Dublin
- Referee: Tom Burke (Louth)
- Attendance: 24,700

The 1928 All-Ireland Senior Football Championship final was the 41st All-Ireland Final and the deciding match of the 1928 All-Ireland Senior Football Championship, an inter-county Gaelic football tournament for the top teams in Ireland.

== Background ==
This was the third of four consecutive appearances in the decider for Kildare.

== Match ==
This year's final was played on 30 September.

=== Summary ===
Cavan claimed that Paddy Loughlin's late goal was thrown into the net. Patsy Devlin hit a goal back to equalise, but Bill Mangan scored a point to win the Sam Maguire Cup for the first time. Tom Burke refereed the game.

1928 was the first year in which the Sam Maguire Cup was awarded to the All-Ireland SFC winner; the cup is still awarded to the winning team.

=== Details ===
==== Kildare ====
- 1 Mick Walsh
- 2 Mick Buckley
- 3 Matt Goff
- 4 Gus Fitzpatrick
- 5 Frank Malone
- 6 Jack Higgins
- 7 Jack Hayes
- 8 Joe Loughlin
- 9 Bill Gannon (c)
- 10 Paddy Martin
- 11 Paddy Loughlin
- 12 Paul Doyle
- 13 Bill Mangan
- 14 Joe Curtis
- 15 Tom Keogh
