= 1927 All-Ireland Senior Football Championship final =

- Event: 1927 All-Ireland Senior Football Championship
Kildare	Kerry
0–5	0–3
- Date: 25 September 1927
- Venue: Croke Park, Dublin
- Referee: T Shevlin (Roscommon)
- Attendance: 36,529
- Weather: Sunny

The 1927 All-Ireland Senior Football Championship final was the 40th All-Ireland Final and the deciding match of the 1927 All-Ireland Senior Football Championship, an inter-county Gaelic football tournament for the top teams in Ireland.

== Background ==
This was the second of four consecutive appearances in the decider for Kildare.

== Match ==
This year's final was played on 25 September.

=== Summary ===
The match was a repeat of the 1926 final which Kerry won by 1–4 to 0–4. Kerry opened the scoring and led by 0–3, with points from Landers, Baily and Ryan before Keogh scored Kildare's first point. At half time the score was 0–3 to 0–1 in favour of Kerry. Kerry failed to score in the second half, while Kildare added scores from Doyle with a free, a second score from Keogh and a point each for Curtis and Martin.

=== Details ===
26 September 1927
Final

Kildare	0–5 – 0–3	Kerry
Keogh (0–2), Doyle (0–1f), Curtis (0–1), Martin (0–1)		Landers (0–1), Baily (0–1), Ryan (0–1)

Croke Park, Dublin
Attendance: 36,529
Referee: T Shevlin (Roscommon)

1	M Walsh
2	M Buckley (c)
3	G Fitzpatrick
4	F Malone
5	J Higgins
6	J Hayes
7	J Loughlin
8	B Gannon
9	J Curtis
10	P Martin
11	P Doyle
12	B Mangan
13	P Loughlin
14	T Keogh
15	M Goff

1	J O'Riordan
2	D O'Connor
3	J Barrett
4	J Walsh
5	D O'Connell
6	P O'Sullivan
7	J Slattery
8	C Brosnan
9	R Stack
10	J Ryan
11	E Fitzgerald
12	T Mahony
13	J Baily
14	JJ Landers
15	JJ Sheehy
