= Tom Burke (Irish revolutionary and sportsman) =

Irish revolutionary and sportsman (1894–1967)

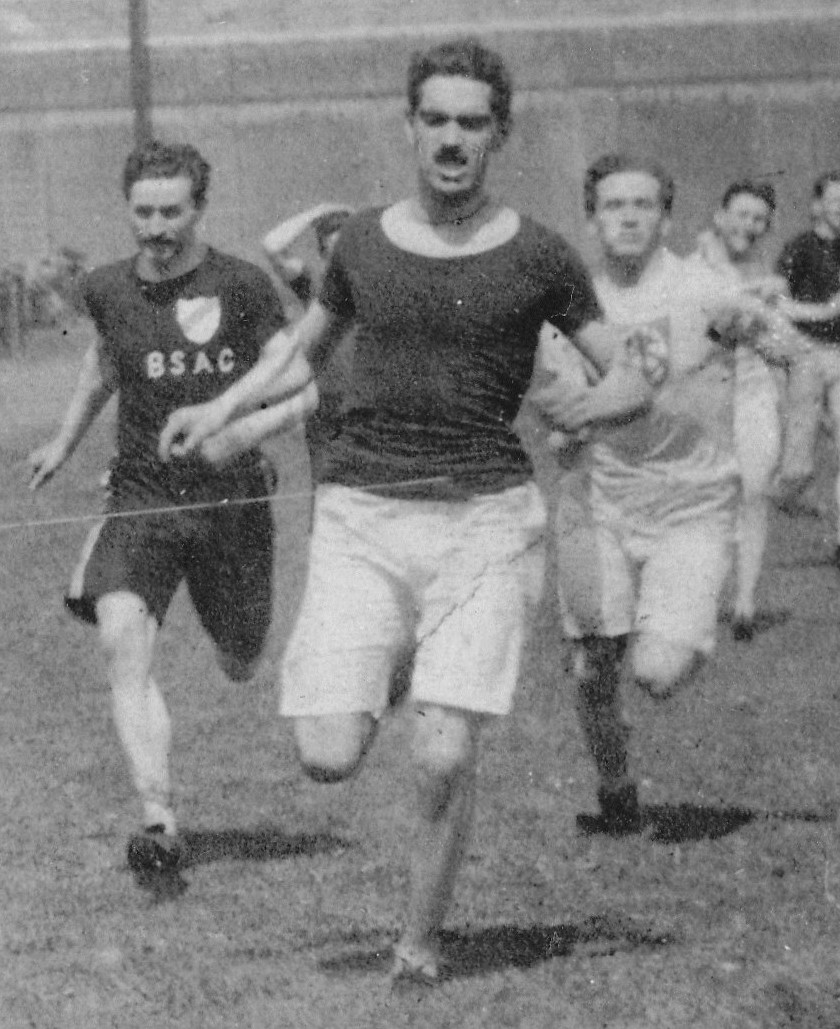
- Burke winning the 440 yard open in Croke Park, 1915
- Born: 17 February 1894; Drogheda, County Louth, Ireland
- Died: 26 August 1967 (aged 73); Drogheda, County Louth, Ireland
- Spouse: Eileen O'Reilly (m. 1931)
- Relatives: Christopher Burke (brother), Eamonn Duggan (cousin)

Thomas Burke (17 February 1894 – 26 August 1967)) was an Irish revolutionary, sportsman and referee. He spent time in 10 British prisons for his revolutionary activities as the founder of the Drogheda Volunteers during the Irish revolutionary period. Burke played inter-county Gaelic football for Louth, and refereed the 1928 All-Ireland Senior Football Championship final. He was also an athlete.

== Early life ==
Thomas Burke was born on 17 February 1894 on Coola Street, Drogheda, County Louth, to Christopher Patrick Burke, secretary of the gas works, and Mary McQuillan. He lived the first 12 years of his life on Coola Street, and was raised in a well-off family. However, things took a turn for the worse with the death of Christopher Burke Snr from Bright's disease on 12 October 1906 at the age of just 44. With the family's source of income gone, his mother moved with him and his five siblings to live with her siblings on Duleek Street.

Burke was a brother of the revolutionary Christopher Burke, and a cousin of the politician Eamonn Duggan.

== Revolutionary activities ==
Thomas Burke was the founder of the Drogheda branch of the Irish Volunteers and was a courier for the revolutionary leader Michael Collins. He served much time in British prisons during the Irish revolutionary period, most notably Frongoch internment camp in 1916, where he captained a Louth side in a game of Gaelic football in the prison. When the truce to end the Irish War of Independence was signed in 1921, Burke was interned in the Curragh.

== Football career ==
Burke captained his county in the 1912 All-Ireland Junior Football Championship final against Tipperary. He achieved success at club level with Stars of Drogheda and subsequently Wolfe Tones, who he helped found in the 1920s. After his playing days ended, he took up refereeing and later chaired the county board for several years.

== Honours ==
Louth

- Leinster Junior Football Championship (1):

1912

Drogheda Stars

- Louth Senior Football Championship (2):

1917, 1919 (As captain)

- Louth Junior Football Championship (2):

1912, 1914 (As captain)

Wolfe Tones

- Louth Senior Football Championship (1):

1925

== Referee work ==
Starting in 1924, Thomas Burke refereed four consecutive Leinster Senior Football Championship (SFC) finals. In 1928, he refereed the Railway Cup final in March, the 1928 final of the Tailteann Games between Ireland and the United States in August, and the All-Ireland SFC semi-final between Sligo and Cavan. That same August, Burke refereed the most important match of his career - the 1928 All-Ireland Senior Football Championship final between Kildare and Cavan. This match was the first final where the Sam Maguire Cup was awarded to the victors, in this case to Kildare.

== Death ==
Thomas Burke died on 26 August 1967 at the age of 73 in Drogheda.

Sporting positions
Preceded by Christy Bellew	Louth County Board Chairman; 1928-31	Succeeded by Séamus Flood
