= Kildare county football team =

Gaelic football team

Kildare
- Sport: Football
- Irish: Cill Dara
- Nickname(s): The Lilywhites
- County board: Kildare GAA
- Manager: Brian Flanagan
- Home venue(s): St Conleth's Park, Newbridge

Recent competitive record
- Current All-Ireland status: Leinster (SF) in 2025
- Last championship title: 1928
- Current NFL Division: 3 (1st in 2025; promoted to Division 2)
- Last league title: None
First colours	Second colours

The Kildare county football team represents Kildare in men's Gaelic football and is governed by Kildare GAA, the county board of the Gaelic Athletic Association. The team competes in the three major annual inter-county competitions; the All-Ireland Senior Football Championship, the Leinster Senior Football Championship and the National Football League.

Kildare's home ground is St Conleth's Park, Newbridge. The team's manager is Brian Flanagan.

The team last won the Leinster Senior Championship in 2000, the All-Ireland Senior Championship in 1928 and has never won the National League.

== History ==
Kildare first entered the All-Ireland Senior Football Championship (SFC) in 1888, and lost to Dublin by a scoreline of 2–7 to 0–1.

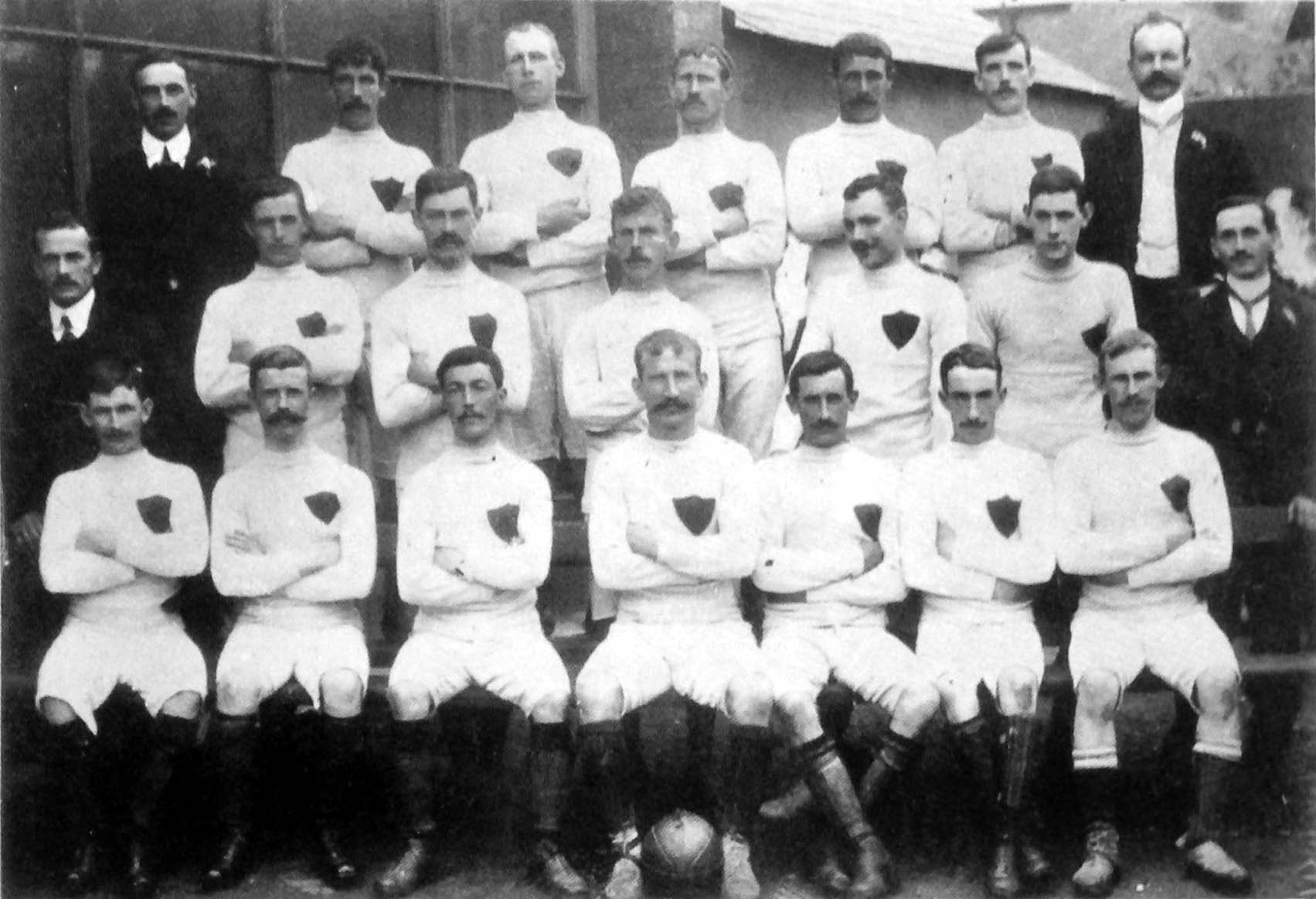
1903 Kildare team

Kildare made a major contribution towards the evolution of rules and tactics in Gaelic football. The county was the first to abandon the tradition of playing 21 people on each team, using 16 on each team for a period. Kildare players invented the hand pass: a polished team tactic since 1903; The toe-to-hand was pioneered by the Roseberry (now Newbridge Sarsfields) club. A team made up of players from the two strongest clubs in the county, Roseberry and Clane, played Kerry three times for the All-Ireland Championship of 1903; the matches drew the first mass interest in a field sport in the country, had an aggregate attendance of 50,000, and were regarded as the games which "made the GAA."

Kildare's four All-Ireland titles were won between 1905 and 1928: over Kerry in 1905, Galway in 1919, and Kerry again in 1927 and Cavan in the 1928 final. Kildare became the first team to win the Sam Maguire Cup in 1928. They haven't won it since.

Tactics such as the hand pass were perfected by those early Kildare teams, but they also developed what became traditional catch-and-kick football. Olympic high jumper Larry Stanley was regarded as one of the greatest fielders in the history of the game, and first winner of the all-time All Star award.

Despite winning a Leinster Senior Football Championship in 1956, reaching the National League final in 1958 and 1968, and winning the All-Ireland Under-21 Football Championship in 1965, Kildare footballers seemed to have difficulty maintaining their proud tradition. The county lost six Leinster finals in the twelve years between 1966 and 1978. Although the Raheens club won a Leinster Senior Club Football Championship title in 1983.

In 1991, former Kerry manager Mick O'Dwyer took charge of the county football team. Kildare lost two more Leinster finals to Dublin in 1992 and 1993, as well as the National League final of 1991. When Dublin came back for a draw in 1994 and won the replay, O'Dwyer was succeeded by Dermot Earley Snr for two years. He returned in 1997, and guided the county to victory over Laois with 13 players and a dramatic, twice replayed series of matches with Meath (which they lost) that captured the imagination of the public and steeled the side for further honors.

In 1998, the Kildare team became the only team in 110 years of championship football to beat the previous three champions, Dublin, Meath and Kerry in turn only to lose to Galway in the All-Ireland final; despite leading by three points at half time. Another Leinster followed in 2000, but Galway defeated them in the semi-final. Leinster Final defeats followed in 2002 and 2003, against Dublin and a Laois side back-boned by their All-Ireland MFC winning sides of the late 1990s. In (2005), Kildare enjoyed mixed success and finished in the top six in the National Football League, but was knocked out of the championship by Sligo.

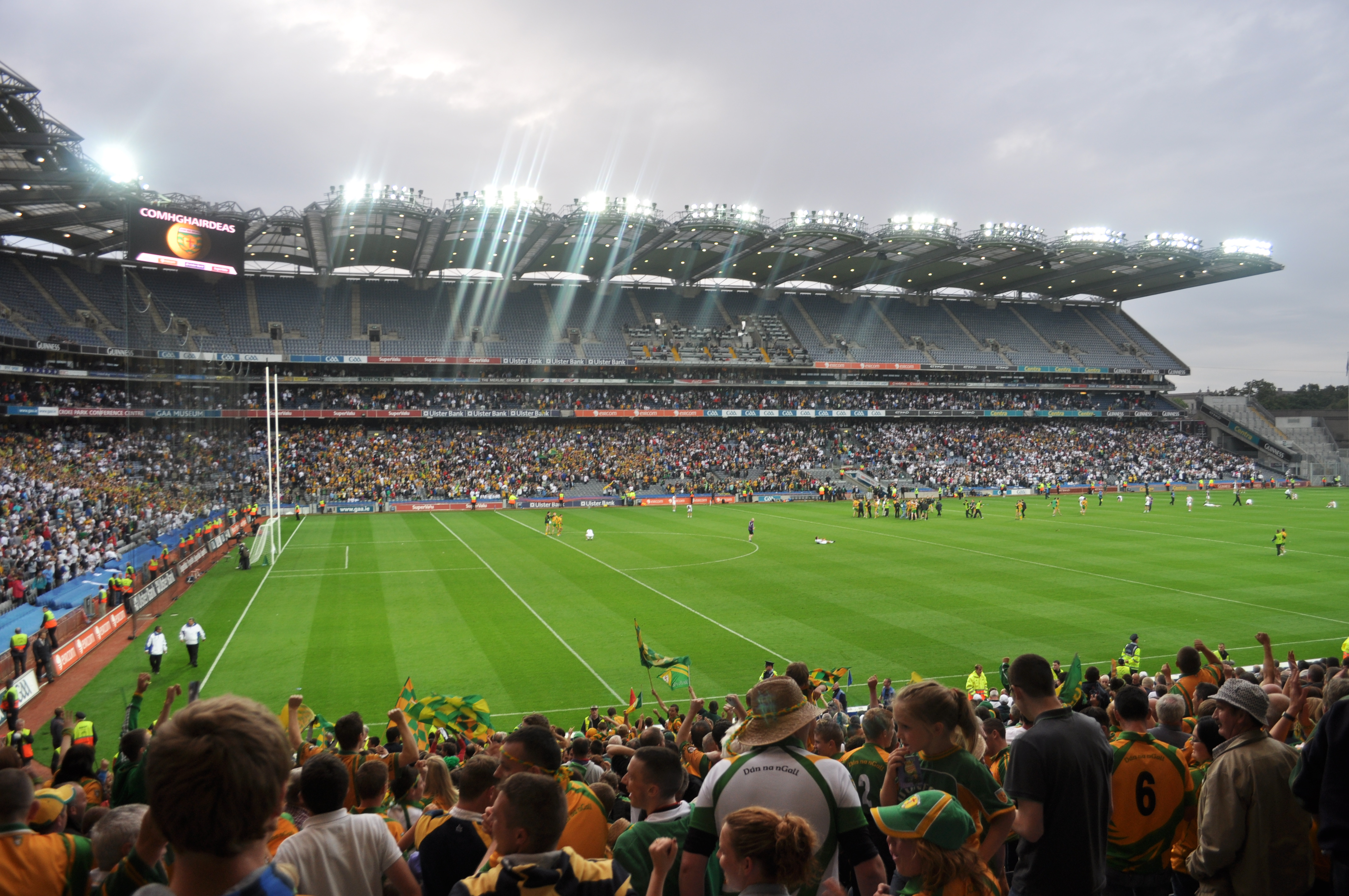
Donegal defeated Kildare in the 2011 All-Ireland Senior Football Championship in Jim McGuinness's first season in charge

In 2008 under the new management of Kieran McGeeney Kildare made a bit of unfortunate history by becoming the first team ever to lose a championship game to Wicklow in Croke Park, losing in the first round by 0–13 to 0–9. However Kildares season took a turn for the better after that by beating Cavan, Limerick and Fermanagh in the all- Ireland qualifiers to reach their first ever all-ireland quarter-final. To date in 2009, an improved Kildare side reached the Leinster Final only to suffer a defeat to Dublin. Kildare advanced to the All-Ireland quarter-final to play then All-Ireland champions Tyrone after beating Wicklow only to be knocked out by Tyrone. 2010 saw Kildare lose to Louth in the 2nd round. However Kildare had a great run through the qualifiers beating teams like Antrim, Leitrim, Derry and Monaghan to once again reach the All-Ireland Quarter-final to face Leinster champions Meath which they got a slow start but enjoyed the 2nd half as they ran out winning 2–17 to 1–12. to reach the All-Semi-final for the first time since 2000. On 29 August 2010 Kildare faced Down for the first time ever in the championship which turned out to be a very tense game but Down ran out winners 1–16 to 1–14 after a very frantic finish. 2011 saw Kildare advance to the Leinster semi-final after defeating Meath in the Leinster quarter-final only to be defeated by Dublin. Kildare had a good run in the qualifiers beating teams like Laois, Meath & Derry to advance to the All-Ireland quarter-final to face Ulster champions Donegal which turned to be a very poor performance but the 2nd half was a real contest from both sides with the sides finishing level to drag the game into extra-time only to be defeated by a single point by Donegal. Niall Carew spent five seasons as a selector under Kieran McGeeney's management, from McGeeney's 2007 appointment, but was a former selector by the end of the 2012 season.

Then, in 2015, Cian O'Neill became manager after being with the Kerry backroom. In 2017 Kildare reached a first Leinster SFC final in 10 years. Only losing to Dublin by 9 points (Dublin 2–23 Kildare 1–17).

Glenn Ryan was hired to manage the team from October 2021. Laois knocked Kildare out of the 2024 Tailteann Cup and that was that for Ryan.

Brian Flanagan was the next managerial appointment.

== Colours and crest ==
The old Kildare GAA crest, showing oak trees, acorns and lily flower, was replaced by the current crest in 2005.

The Kildare crest had a serpent on it until 1993, reflecting that of Kildare County Council, itself based on the crest for the town of Naas. When Kildare County Council had the Heraldic Office of Ireland create a proper crest in 1991, and with Kildare fans regarding the serpent as a bad omen, the Kildare Supporters' Club requested a new one for their county teams; this featured acorns above a bunch of lilies (the county council one differed in that it had a Brigid's cross, a harp, a horse's head and acorns). Kildare still lost in the first round of the Leinster Senior Football Championship (SFC) for three years afterwards, from 1994 until 1996.

The 1993 crest is no longer in use.

== Support ==
There is a Kildare Supporters' Club.

Kildare had songs in the official Irish Top 40 ahead of the 1998 All-Ireland SFC final. These were "C'mon you Lilywhites" by Sean Brennan and "Up the Lilywhites" by Brendan Cummins.

Other songs from then included "The Lilywhites Are On The March" by John Rafferty, "Cill Dara Abu" by Paul McCormack and "The Power and the Glory" by the Patrician Primary Pipe and Brass Band.

== Panel ==
Team as per Kildare vs Fermanagh in the Tailteann Cup semi-final, 22 June 2025

No.	Player	Position	Club
1	Cian Burke	Goalkeeper	Clane
2	Harry O'Neill	Right Corner Back	Clane
3	Mark Dempsey	Full back	Moorefield
4	Ryan Burke	Left Corner Back	Caragh
5	Brian Byrne	Right half back	Moorefield
6	David Hyland	Centre back	Athy
7	James McGrath	Left half back	Athy
8	Kevin Feely (c)	Midfield	Athy
9	Brendan Gibbons	Midfield	Kilcock
10	Tommy Gill	Right half forward	Carbury
11	Alex Beirne	Centre forward	Naas
12	Colm Dalton	Left half forward	Sallins
13	Ryan Sinkey	Right corner forward	Naas
14	Darragh Kirwan	Full forward	Naas
15	Daniel Flynn	Left corner forward	Johnstownbridge

No.	Player	Position	Club
16	Didier Cordonier	Substitute	Two Mile House
17	Jack McKevitt	Substitute	Naas
18	Mick O'Grady	Substitute	Celbridge
19	Kevin Flynn	Substitute	Celbridge
20	Callum Bolton	Substitute	Sarsfields
21	Aaron Masterson	Substitute	Moorefield
22	Paddy McDermott	Substitute	Naas
23	Darragh Swords	Substitute	Caragh
24	Brian MCLoughlin	Substitute	Clane
25	Niall Kelly	Substitute	Athy
26	Eoin Cully	Substitute	Carbury

== Management team ==
Appointed Month 2024:

- Manager: Brian Flanagan
- Selector: Aidan O'Rourke
- Selector: Damian Hendy
- Selector: Daryl Flynn

== Managerial history ==
- Joe Rafferty 1905
- Joe McDonald (coach) 1919
- Mick O'Reilly (coach) 1958
- Jim Clarke 1965
- Mick O'Reilly (coach) 1968
- Frank Murphy (coach) 1972

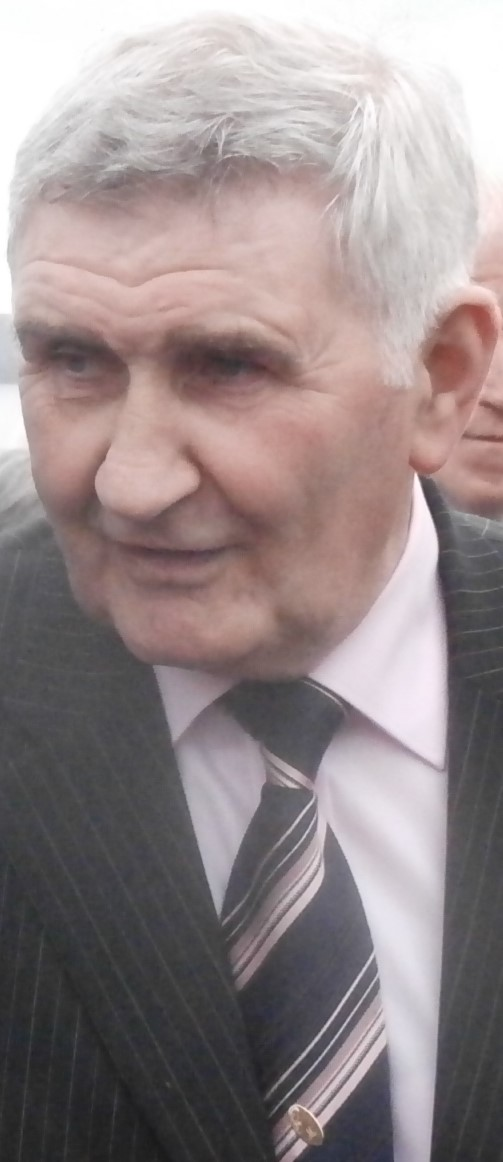
Mick O'Dwyer managed Kildare to the 1998 All-Ireland Senior Football Championship final, the team's most recent appearance at this stage of the competition.

1975 onwards
Dates	Name	Origin	Honours
1974	Pat Mangan		—N/a
1975–1981	Eamonn O'Donoghue		—N/a
1982–1984	Bobby Burns		—N/a
1985	Eamonn O'Donoghue (2)		—N/a
1986–1987 (pt.)	John Courtney		—N/a
1987 (pt.)–1990	Pat Fitzgerald		—N/a
1991–1994	Mick O'Dwyer		—N/a
1995–1996	Dermot Earley		—N/a
1997–2002	Mick O'Dwyer (2)		1998 Leinster Senior Football Championship, 2000 Leinster Senior Football Championship
2002–2005	Pádraig Nolan	Kilcock	2003 O'Byrne Cup
2005–2007	John Crofton	Sarsfields	—N/a
2007–2013	Kieran McGeeney		2011 O'Byrne Cup, 2012 NFL Division 2, 2013 O'Byrne Cup
2013–2015	Jason Ryan		2014 O'Byrne Cup
2016–2019	Cian O'Neill	Moorefield	—N/a
2020–2021	Jack O'Connor		—N/a
2021–2024	Glenn Ryan	Round Towers	—N/a
2024–	Brian Flanagan	Johnstownbridge	2025 Tailteann Cup

== Players ==
=== All Stars ===
Nominations

1998: Christy Byrne, Ronan Quinn, Anthony Rainbow, Niall Buckley, Willie McCreery, Declan Kerrigan, Martin Lynch, Eddie McCormack
2000: Christy Byrne, Ken Doyle, Glenn Ryan, Willie McCreery
2002: Dermot Earley
2003: Enda Murphy
2007: Johnny Doyle
2008: Johnny Doyle
2009: James Kavanagh, Alan Smith
2010: Emmet Bolton, Eamonn Callaghan, James Kavanagh
2011: Hugh McGrillen
2012: Emmet Bolton
2017: Kevin Feely, Daniel Flynn
2018: Eoin Doyle, Daniel Flynn, Paul Cribben
2021: Daniel Flynn

=== Football Team of the Millennium ===
Ollie Crinnigan (Carbury), Matt Goff (Leixlip), Pa Connolly (Clane), Glenn Ryan (Round Towers), Jack Higgins (Naas), Mick Carolan (Athy), Larry Stanley (Caragh), Pat Mangan (Carbury), Jack Donnelly (Ellistown), Paddy "Boiler" White (Sarsfields), Larry Tompkins (Eadestown and Castlehaven (Cork), Pat Dunny (Raheens), Tommy Carew (Clane), Paul Doyle (Suncroft). 15th player tbd

== Honours ==
=== National ===
- All-Ireland Senior Football Championship
  - (gold) Winners (4): 1905, 1919, 1927, 1928
  - (silver) Runners-up (5): 1926, 1929, 1931, 1935, 1998
- Tailteann Cup
  - (gold) Winners (1): 2025
- National Football League
  - (silver) Runners-up (5): 1927–28, 1928–29, 1957–58, 1967–68, 1990–91
- National Football League Division 2
  - (gold) Winners (2): 2012 2021
- National Football League Division 3
  - (silver) Runners-up (1): 2025
- All-Ireland Under-21/Under-20 Football Championship
  - (gold) Winners (3): 1965, 2018, 2023
  - (silver) Runners-up (4): 1966, 1976, 2008, 2022
- All-Ireland Minor Football Championship
  - (silver) Runners-up (1): 1973

=== Provincial ===
- Leinster Senior Football Championship
  - (gold) Winners (13): 1903, 1905, 1919, 1926, 1927, 1928, 1929, 1930, 1931, 1935, 1956, 1998, 2000
  - (silver) Runners-up (23): 1891, 1906, 1908, 1916, 1920, 1921, 1925, 1936, 1938, 1946, 1966, 1969, 1971, 1975, 1978, 1992, 1993, 2002, 2003, 2009, 2017, 2021, 2022
- O'Byrne Cup
  - (gold) Winners (11): 1962, 1968, 1970, 1973, 1976, 1982, 1989, 2003, 2011, 2013, 2014
- Leinster Junior Football Championship
  - (gold) Winners (12): 1927, 1931, 1938, 1956, 1965, 1967, 1970, 1989, 2004, 2011, 2013, 2018
- Leinster Under-21/Under-20 Football Championship
  - (gold) Winners (14): 1965, 1966, 1967, 1972, 1976, 1983, 1992, 2004, 2008, 2013, 2018, 2022, 2023, 2026
  - (silver) Runners-up (8): 1973, 1977, 1980, 1985, 1989, 2005, 2015, 2016
- Leinster Minor Football Championship
  - (gold) Winners (10): 1973, 1975, 1983, 1987, 1991, 2013, 2015, 2016, 2019, 2026
  - (silver) Runners-up (13): 1934, 1940, 1942, 1949, 1953, 1965, 1980, 1989, 1990, 2004, 2009, 2014, 2018
