= Peter Kelly (Gaelic footballer) =

Kildare Gaelic footballer

Personal information
- Born: County Kildare, Ireland
- Height: 6 ft 1 in (185 cm)

Sport
- Sport: Gaelic football
- Position: Defender
Club
- Years: Club
- Two Mile House
Inter-county
- Years: County
- 2010–: Kildare
Inter-county titles
- Leinster titles: 0
- All Stars: 1

Peter Kelly is an Irish Gaelic footballer who plays for his club Two Mile House and the Kildare county team.

In October 2010, Kelly was named in the 2010 All Stars Award football team as a result of his performances for Kildare during the 2010 season; it was his first All Stars Award in his first season.
