= Chris Burke =

Chris or Christopher Burke may refer to:

- Christopher Burke (Irish revolutionary) (1898–1964), Irish revolutionary, hunger striker and sportsman
- Chris Burke (actor) (born 1965), American actor and folk singer
- Chris Burke (baseball) (born 1980), Major League Baseball player
- Chris Burke (footballer) (born 1983), Scottish footballer
- Christopher Burke (design writer) (born 1967), British typeface designer and author on typography
- Chris Burke (priest) (born 1965), Church of England priest
- Christopher Burke, guitarist with Beach Fossils
- Christopher Burke, astronomer Ursa Minor Dwarf

== See also ==
- Chris Burke-Gaffney, Canadian songwriter and producer
