= 1928 All-Ireland Senior Football Championship =

Football championship

All-Ireland Champions
- Winning team: Kildare (4th win)
- Captain: Bill 'Squires' Gannon

All-Ireland Finalists
- Losing team: Cavan
- Captain: Jim Smith

Provincial Champions
- Munster: Cork
- Leinster: Kildare
- Ulster: Cavan
- Connacht: Sligo

Championship statistics

The 1928 All-Ireland Senior Football Championship was the 42nd staging of Ireland's premier Gaelic football knock-out competition. Kildare were the winners.

== Results ==
=== Connacht Senior Football Championship ===
10 June 1928
Quarter-Final

Leitrim	1–0 – 1–0	Galway

Roscommon

24 June 1928
Quarter-Final Replay

Leitrim	0–7 – 0–3	Galway

Roscommon

17 June 1928
Semi-Final

Mayo	1–5 – 0–3	Roscommon
J Forde (1–0).

Ballyhaunis

15 July 1928
Semi-Final

Sligo	1–5 – 0–2	Leitrim

Boyle
Attendance: 5,000

5 August 1928
Final

Sligo	1–4 – 0–6	Mayo
		JJ Walsh (0–2), G Courell (0–3, two frees).

Tuam
Attendance: 9,000

=== Leinster Senior Football Championship ===
May 1928
Quarter-Final

Wexford	7–7 – 3–4	Kilkenny

New Ross

May 1928
Quarter-Final

Longford	3–4 – 0–11	Meath

Mullingar

20 May 1928
Quarter-Final

Dublin	0–5 – 0–3	Louth

Navan

20 May 1928
Quarter-Final

Kildare	0–4 – 1–0	Laois
A. O'Neill, J. Loughlin, F. Malone, T. Keogh 0–1 each	Report	J. Brown 1–0

Geraldine Park, Athy
Referee: S. J. Donnelly (Dublin)

10 June 1928
Semi-Final

Kildare	3–6 – 0–2	Longford
P Ryan 2–1; P Pringle 1–0; P. Martin 0–2; J Curtis, P Loughlin, Keogh 0–1 each	Report	M. Deane 0–2

Croke Park, Dublin
Referee: J. Byrne (Louth)

8 July 1928
Semi-Final

Dublin	3–3 – 0–4	Wexford

Croke Park, Dublin
Referee: T. Burke (Louth)

22 July 1928
Final

Kildare	0–10 – 1–6	Dublin
Paul Doyle (0-2f) and Paddy Loughlin 0–3 each, Joe Curtis 0–2, Paddy Martin and Tom Keogh 0–1 each	Report	M Durnin 1–0, Joe Synott 0–3, Jack Reilly, Joe Stynes, Mick O'Brien 0–1 each

Croke Park, Dublin
Attendance: 15,000
Referee: Jim Byrne (Wexford)

=== Munster Senior Football Championship ===
10 June 1928
Quarter-Final

Kerry	3–4 – 0–5	Clare
J O'Connor 1–0, P Russell 0–3, P Whitty 0–1

The Cricket Field, Kilrush

8 July 1928
Semi-Final

Tipperary	1–7 – 2–3	Kerry
		J J Sheehy 1–2, N Sweeney 1–0, P Russell 0–1

Tipperary
Referee: W. Walsh (Waterford)

5 August 1928
Final

Cork	4–3 – 0–4	Tipperary

Fraher Field, Dungarvan
Referee: P. Whelan (W)

=== Ulster Senior Football Championship ===
27 May 1928
Quarter-Final

Tyrone	7–3 – 2–3	Derry

Dungannon

27 May 1928
Quarter-Final

Monaghan	3–5 – 1–3	Down

St. Mary's Park, Castleblayney

10 June 1928
Quarter-Final

Armagh	6–3 – 1–7	Fermanagh

Brewster Park, Enniskillen

17 June 1928
Quarter-Final

Cavan	1–5 – 0–2	Antrim

Belturbet

1 July 1928
Semi-Final

Armagh	0–4 – 0–1	Monaghan

Carrickmacross

8 July 1928
Semi-Final

Cavan	4–3 – 0–4	Tyrone

Dungannon

29 July 1928
Final

Cavan	2–6 – 1–4	Armagh

Breffni Park, Cavan
Attendance: 6,000

=== All-Ireland Senior Football Championship ===
26 August 1928
Semi-Final

Cavan	2–5 – 0–4	Sligo

Breffni Park, Cavan

2 September 1928
Semi-Final

Kildare	3–7 – 0–2	Cork
W.Mangan 3–0, P.Doyle 0–5, J.Curtis, P.Loughlin 0–1.

Croke Park, Dublin
Referee: J. Shevlin (Roscommon)

30 September 1928
Final

Kildare	2–6 – 2–5	Cavan
P.Doyle 0–5, W.Mangan, P.Loughlin 1–0, T.Keogh 0–1.

Croke Park, Dublin
Attendance: 24,700
Referee: Tom Burke (Louth)

== Championship statistics ==
=== Miscellaneous ===
- Cork win the Munster title for the first time since 1916.
- Sligo win the Connacht title for the first time ever.
- Kildare are All Ireland champions for the second year in a row.

== Roll of Honour ==
- Dublin – 14 (1923)
- Kerry – 7 (1926)
- Wexford – 5 (1918)
- Kildare – 4 (1928)
- Tipperary – 4 (1920)
- Limerick – 2 (1896)
- Cork – 2 (1911)
- Louth – 2 (1912)
- Galway – 1 (1925)
