= 2014 Dr McKenna Cup =

Tournament details
- Province: Ulster
- Year: 2014

The 2014 Dr McKenna Cup was a Gaelic football competition played under the auspices of Ulster GAA.

The tournament's final was to be contested by Cavan and Tyrone, a repeat of the 2000 decider, at Brewster Park in Enniskillen on 25 January. However, the final was postponed due to an unplayable pitch until 15 February. Tyrone were defending champions. Cavan had last won the competition in 2000, also the last occasion on which they had contested the final.

Tyrone retained the title, winning the final 1–15 to 0–11.

== See also ==
- 2014 O'Byrne Cup
- 2014 McGrath Cup
