= Eamonn Duggan =

Irish lawyer and politician (1878–1936)

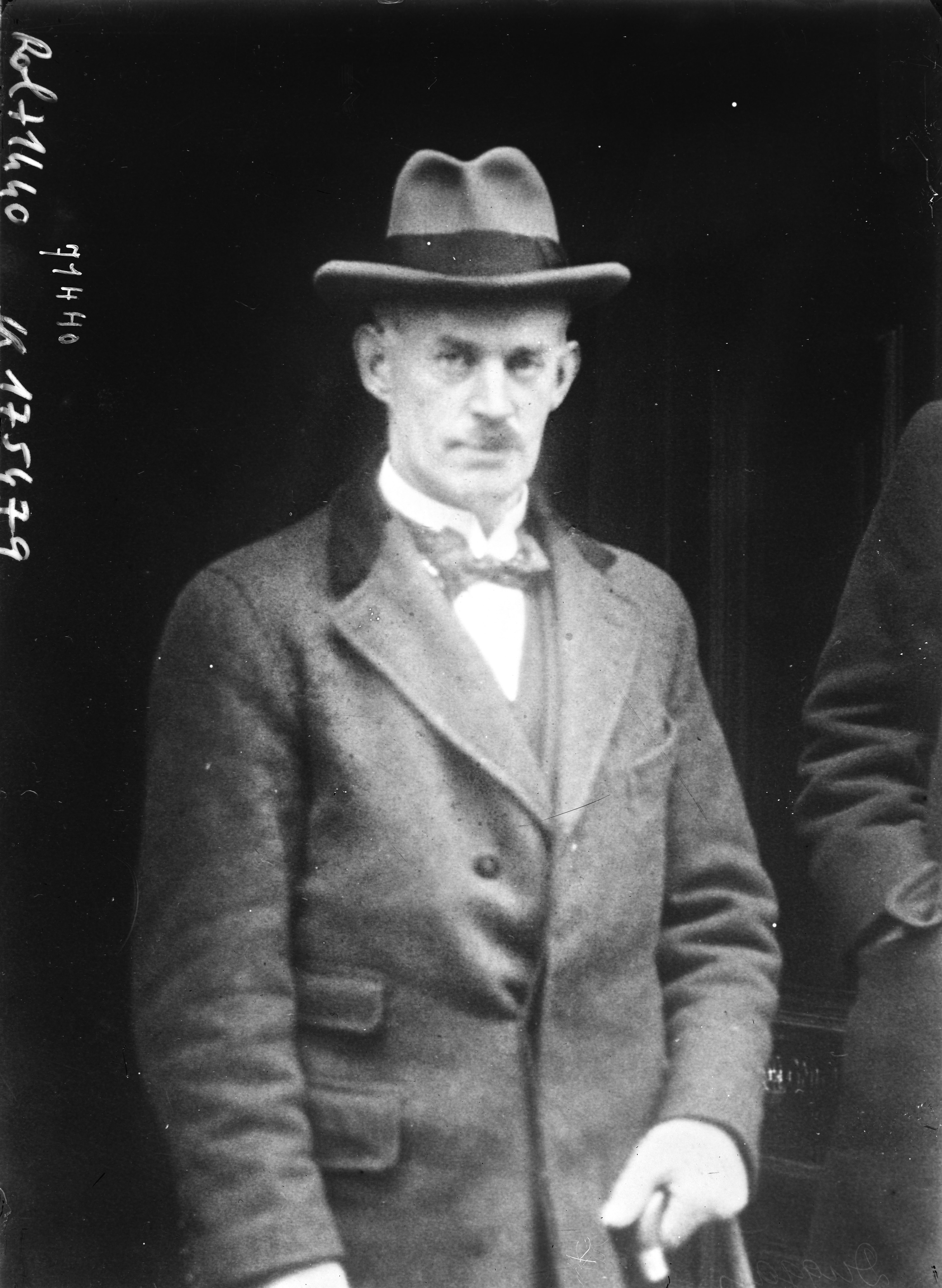
- Duggan in 1922

Parliamentary Secretary
- 1927–1932: Government Chief Whip
- 1927–1932: Defence
- 1926–1927: Finance
- 1922–1926: Executive Council

Minister without portfolio
- In office 12 September 1922 – 8 December 1922
- President: W. T. Cosgrave
- Preceded by: New office
- Succeeded by: Office abolished

Minister for Home Affairs
- In office 10 January 1922 – 9 September 1922
- President: Michael Collins
- Preceded by: Austin Stack
- Succeeded by: Kevin O'Higgins

Senator
- In office 19 April 1933 – 29 May 1936

Teachta Dála
- In office August 1923 – January 1933
- Constituency: Meath
- In office May 1921 – August 1923
- Constituency: Louth–Meath
- In office December 1918 – May 1921
- Constituency: Meath South

Personal details
- Born: Edmund John Duggan; 2 March 1878 Richhill, County Armagh, Ireland
- Died: 6 June 1936 (aged 58) Dún Laoghaire, Dublin, Ireland
- Resting place: Glasnevin Cemetery, Dublin, Ireland
- Party: Fine Gael; Cumann na nGaedheal; Sinn Féin
- Spouse: Evelyn Kavanagh (m. 1909)
- Relations: Tom Burke (cousin); Christopher Burke (cousin)
- Children: 1
- Education: University College Dublin

Military service
- Allegiance: Irish Volunteers; Irish Republican Army
- Years of service: 1917–1919
- Rank: Director of Intelligence
- Battles/wars: Easter Rising; Irish War of Independence

Eamonn Seán Duggan (Irish: Éamonn Ó Dúgáin; 2 March 1878 – 6 June 1936) was an Irish lawyer and politician who served as Government Chief Whip and Parliamentary Secretary to the Minister for Defence from 1927 to 1932, Parliamentary Secretary to the Minister for Finance from 1926 to 1927, Parliamentary Secretary to the Executive Council from 1922 to 1926, Minister without portfolio September 1922 to December 1922 and Minister for Home Affairs January 1922 to September 1922. He served as a Teachta Dála (TD) from 1918 to 1933. He was a Senator from 1933 to 1936.

== Early life ==
Edmund John Duggan was born in Richhill, County Armagh, in 1878, the son of William Duggan, a Royal Irish Constabulary officer, and Margaret Dunne. His parents had met when his father, a native of County Wicklow, was stationed in Longwood, County Meath, where they married on 19 October 1874. William was transferred to County Armagh the following year as officers could not serve in their wife's native county.

In 1911, Duggan was living with his parents on St. Brigid's Road Upper in Drumcondra, Dublin. His siblings, William, Margaret and James, were also living there. There were six children born but only four survived by 1911.

After his school education, Duggan began work as a law clerk. During his early years, he became heavily involved in politics after he qualified as a solicitor and set up a practice at 66 Dame Street in Dublin. Duggan was married to Evelyn Kavanagh and together they had one son.

As a keen supporter of Irish independence, Duggan fought in the 1916 Easter Rising; however, following its failure he was subject to court-martial and was sentenced to three years penal servitude. Under the general amnesty of 1917, he was released after 14 months in prison, and returned to Dublin where he went back to studying law. For a period, Duggan also served as Irish Republican Army (IRA) Director of Intelligence.

Duggan was a cousin of revolutionaries Thomas Burke and Christopher Burke through his mother Margaret Dunne.

== 1916 Easter Rising ==
In 1916, Duggan was part of Commandant Daly and therefore was serving in the North Dublin Union in the days approaching the 1916 Rising and afterwards Father Matthew Hall. One of Duggan's close friends Thomas Allen was shot while Duggan was at the Four Courts. Duggan's efforts to get medical assistance were unsuccessful at Richmond Hospital as the British officer who responded to the call declined the message and didn't allow it to go through. Eventually medical assistance was received but it was too late for Allen. In Duggan's region, the volunteers suffered very few injuries with the most violent fighting taking place on Friday night and Saturday morning.

Duggan suffered the consequences and was then sentenced to penal servitude which lasted three years. He was interned in Maidstone, Portland and Lewes prisons. Éamon de Valera and Duggan's attempts at Lewes to fight the authorities and collapse the prison system proved to be victorious as in June 1917, they were both released and Duggan finally got to go back to Dublin and followed his previous roots in law and continued his career as a solicitor.

== After 1916 ==
When Duggan was released in 1917, he continued his career in law. Duggan was elected to the First Dáil Éireann as a Sinn Féin TD for Meath South following the 1918 general election. The Drogheda Independent reported "Never before was a successful candidate accorded such a princely reception".

Duggan engaged in the War of Independence and his role in this was the IRA's Director of Intelligence, this came to an end in November 1920 when he was imprisoned again and was not released until the Anglo-Irish Truce of July 1921. When the truce concluded, Duggan was authorised with plenipotentiary status as one of the five Irish envoys to discuss and finalise the treaty with the British Prime Minister David Lloyd George. He signed the Anglo-Irish Treaty at 22 Hans Place, London.

Duggan retained numerous ministerial posts in the Cumann na nGaedheal government. In 1921, Duggan played a role in the Irish delegation throughout the Anglo-Irish discussions, he then played a dominant role in liaising with British officials.

== Involvement in politics ==
After the post-treaty government, Duggan was appointed as Minister for Home Affairs and shortly afterwards he became the Parliamentary Secretary for the executive council and the Minister for Defence. Duggan continued in various roles as a TD until 1933. These included Government Chief Whip from 1927 to 1932.

Until 1933, Duggan was a Cumann na nGaedheal TD for Meath. In 1933, Duggan declined to contest the general election but was elected to Seanad in April 1933. He also was involved in local politics in Dún Laoghaire as the chairman of the borough council until he died in 1936.

== Duggan's papers ==
Duggan wrote papers which reflected on his engagement in the Easter Rising. In his letters, Duggan wrote about the tough times he spent imprisoned in Lewes, Mountjoy and Portland. Duggan also wrote about his participation in Sinn Féin how he was released in 1917, and 1918, how he was triumphant in being a candidate for the South Meath constituency. Most of Duggan's papers consisted of letters to his fiancée and later wife, May Duggan, which he wrote while he was in prison. Duggan's papers were very personal as they consisted of photographs of him, his family members his political associates etc. Also information of his time as a TD was included. In one of his letters, which Duggan wrote on 25 April 1916, he referenced 'the whole damn family' consisting of information as to how his volunteers and he were being 'treated as princes' by the nuns in the convent nearby, receiving help from the children in the area and building barricades. In his letter, Duggan also writes about morale amongst his comrades and hearing rumours about a German who had landed in County Kerry. News had emerged of Sean Connolly's death and that the British Army were unfair in concluding the rebellion. In Duggan's note, he proclaims that the letter should be sent to May Duggan who was his fiancée at the time. At the end of the letter Duggan referred to himself as 'Edmund' which he is also known as.

== Death ==
Duggan died suddenly at his home in Dún Laoghaire, Dublin, on 6 June 1936, aged 58, and was buried in Glasnevin Cemetery on the north side of Dublin.

Parliament of the United Kingdom
| Preceded by David Sheehy | Member of Parliament for Meath South; 1918–1922 | Constituency abolished |
Oireachtas
| New constituency | Teachta Dála for Meath South; 1918–1921 | Constituency abolished |
Political offices
| Preceded by Austin Stack | Minister for Home Affairs; Jan – Sep 1922 | Succeeded by Kevin O'Higgins |
| Preceded by – | Minister without portfolio Sep – Dec 1922 | Succeeded by – |
| New office | Parliamentary Secretary to the Executive Council; 1922–1926 | Office abolished |
| Preceded by John M. O'Sullivan | Parliamentary Secretary to the Minister for Finance; 1926–1927 | Succeeded by Séamus Burke |
| Preceded by James Dolan | Government Chief Whip; 1927–1932 | Succeeded by Gerald Boland |
| Preceded by George Nicolls | Parliamentary Secretary to the Minister for Defence; 1927–1932 | Succeeded by Gerald Boland |
Military offices
| New office | Irish Republican Army Director of Intelligence; 1917–1919 | Succeeded by Michael Collins |

| Dáil | Election | Deputy (Party) | Deputy (Party) | Deputy (Party) | Deputy (Party) | Deputy (Party) |
|---|---|---|---|---|---|---|
| 2nd | 1921 | Justin McKenna (SF) | Eamonn Duggan (SF) | Peter Hughes (SF) | James Murphy (SF) | John J. O'Kelly (SF) |
| 3rd | 1922 | Cathal O'Shannon (Lab) | Eamonn Duggan (PT-SF) | Peter Hughes (PT-SF) | James Murphy (PT-SF) | John J. O'Kelly (AT-SF) |
| 4th | 1923 | Constituency abolished. See Louth and Meath | | | | |

| Dáil | Election | Deputy (Party) | Deputy (Party) | Deputy (Party) |
|---|---|---|---|---|
| 4th | 1923 | Patrick Mulvany (FP) | David Hall (Lab) | Eamonn Duggan (CnaG) |
| 5th | 1927 (Jun) | Matthew O'Reilly (FF) | David Hall (Lab) | Eamonn Duggan (CnaG) |
| 6th | 1927 (Sep) | Matthew O'Reilly (FF) | Arthur Matthews (CnaG) | Eamonn Duggan (CnaG) |
| 7th | 1932 | James Kelly (FF) | Arthur Matthews (CnaG) | Eamonn Duggan (CnaG) |
| 8th | 1933 | James Kelly (FF) | Robert Davitt (CnaG) | Matthew O'Reilly (FF) |
| 9th | 1937 | Constituency abolished. See Meath–Westmeath | | |

| Dáil | Election | Deputy (Party) | Deputy (Party) | Deputy (Party) | Deputy (Party) | Deputy (Party) |
|---|---|---|---|---|---|---|
| 13th | 1948 | Matthew O'Reilly (FF) | Michael Hilliard (FF) | 3 seats until 1977 | Patrick Giles (FG) | 3 seats until 1977 |
| 14th | 1951 | Matthew O'Reilly (FF) | Michael Hilliard (FF) | 3 seats until 1977 | Patrick Giles (FG) | 3 seats until 1977 |
| 15th | 1954 | James Tully (Lab) | Michael Hilliard (FF) | 3 seats until 1977 | Patrick Giles (FG) | 3 seats until 1977 |
| 16th | 1957 | James Griffin (FF) | Michael Hilliard (FF) | 3 seats until 1977 | Patrick Giles (FG) | 3 seats until 1977 |
| 16th | 1959 by-election | Henry Johnston (FF) | Michael Hilliard (FF) | 3 seats until 1977 | Patrick Giles (FG) | 3 seats until 1977 |
| 17th | 1961 | James Tully (Lab) | Michael Hilliard (FF) | 3 seats until 1977 | Denis Farrelly (FG) | 3 seats until 1977 |
| 18th | 1965 | James Tully (Lab) | Michael Hilliard (FF) | 3 seats until 1977 | Denis Farrelly (FG) | 3 seats until 1977 |
| 19th | 1969 | James Tully (Lab) | Michael Hilliard (FF) | 3 seats until 1977 | John Bruton (FG) | 3 seats until 1977 |
| 20th | 1973 | James Tully (Lab) | Brendan Crinion (FF) | 3 seats until 1977 | John Bruton (FG) | 3 seats until 1977 |
| 21st | 1977 | James Tully (Lab) | Brendan Crinion (FF) | Jim Fitzsimons (FF) | John Bruton (FG) | 4 seats 1977–1981 |
| 22nd | 1981 | James Tully (Lab) | Brendan Crinion (FF) | Jim Fitzsimons (FF) | John Bruton (FG) | John V. Farrelly (FG) |
| 23rd | 1982 (Feb) | Michael Lynch (FF) | Colm Hilliard (FF) | Jim Fitzsimons (FF) | John Bruton (FG) | John V. Farrelly (FG) |
| 24th | 1982 (Nov) | Frank McLoughlin (Lab) | Colm Hilliard (FF) | Jim Fitzsimons (FF) | John Bruton (FG) | John V. Farrelly (FG) |
| 25th | 1987 | Michael Lynch (FF) | Colm Hilliard (FF) | Noel Dempsey (FF) | John Bruton (FG) | John V. Farrelly (FG) |
| 26th | 1989 | Mary Wallace (FF) | Colm Hilliard (FF) | Noel Dempsey (FF) | John Bruton (FG) | John V. Farrelly (FG) |
| 27th | 1992 | Mary Wallace (FF) | Colm Hilliard (FF) | Noel Dempsey (FF) | John Bruton (FG) | Brian Fitzgerald (Lab) |
| 28th | 1997 | Mary Wallace (FF) | Johnny Brady (FF) | Noel Dempsey (FF) | John Bruton (FG) | John V. Farrelly (FG) |
| 29th | 2002 | Mary Wallace (FF) | Johnny Brady (FF) | Noel Dempsey (FF) | John Bruton (FG) | Damien English (FG) |
| 29th | 2005 by-election | Mary Wallace (FF) | Johnny Brady (FF) | Noel Dempsey (FF) | Shane McEntee (FG) | Damien English (FG) |
| 30th | 2007 | Constituency abolished. See Meath East and Meath West | | | | |
