= Daniel Flynn (footballer) =

Personal information
- Full name: Daniel Flynn
- Born: 24 September 1994 (age 32); Ireland
- Draft: No. 54, 2014 Rookie Draft: Port Adelaide
- Height: 190 cm (75 in)
- Weight: 93 kg (205 lb)
- Position: Defender

Playing career^{1}
Years	Club	Games (Goals)
2014	Port Adelaide	0 (0)
- ^{1} Playing statistics correct to the end of 2014.

Daniel Flynn
Personal information
- Height: 6 ft 3 in (1.91 m)

Sport
- Sport: Gaelic football
- Position: Full Forward
Club
- Years: Club
- Johnstownbridge
Inter-county
- Years: County
- 2013-present: Kildare

Daniel Flynn (born 24 September 1994) is a Gaelic Footballer from Kildare and former professional Australian rules footballer who played for the Port Adelaide Football Club in the South Australian National Football League (SANFL).

Originally from a farm near Johnstownbridge, Flynn trialled with Port Adelaide in the AFL early in 2014 and played in a NAB Challenge pre-season match against the Adelaide Football Club, in a losing effort. This was one of Flynn's first games of Australian rules football, let alone his first game in an AFL sanctioned competition.

Flynn was assigned to Port Adelaide's SANFL team before returning to Ireland in March 2014. He then came back to Port Adelaide in May and spent the rest of the season playing in the SANFL, including the Grand Final. Before the start of the 2015 AFL season, Port Adelaide announced that Flynn had returned to Ireland and would not be returning to the club, citing homesickness.
