= 2014 O'Byrne Cup =

Tournament details
- Province: Leinster
- Year: 2014
- Trophy: O'Byrne Cup

Winners
- Champions: Kildare (10th win)

The 2014 O'Byrne Cup was a Gaelic football competition played by the teams of Leinster GAA: eleven county teams (all except Kilkenny) and five third-level colleges' teams competed. Kildare were the winners for the third time in four years.

== Format ==
The sixteen teams are drawn into four groups of four, each team playing all the other teams in its group once. The top team in each group progresses to the semi-finals.

== Finals ==
19 January 2014; 2 p.m. Semi-final	UCD	2-11 – 5-17	Kildare	St. Conleth's Park, Newbridge

19 January 2014; 2 p.m. Semi-final	Meath	4-18 – 3-6	DCU	Páirc Tailteann, Navan

26 January 2014; 2 p.m. Final	Meath	0-9 – 1-10	Kildare	St. Conleth's Park, Newbridge; Referee: Fergal Kelly (Longford); Man of the Match: Paul Cribbin (Kildare)
26 January 2014; 2 p.m. Final	M Newman 0-4 (3f, '45'); E Wallace, S Bray 0-2 each; D Larkin 0-1	Report	D Mulhall 0-4 (2f)l T Moolick 1-0; P Cribbin 0-2; C McNally, S Hurley, P Brophy 0-1 each	St. Conleth's Park, Newbridge; Referee: Fergal Kelly (Longford); Man of the Match: Paul Cribbin (Kildare)

== See also ==
- 2014 Dr McKenna Cup
