= Matt Goff =

Irish Gaelic footballer

Personal information
- Born: 5 July 1901 Kildare, Ireland
- Died: 19 March 1956 (aged 54)
- Occupation: Military Police Officer

Sport
- Sport: Gaelic football
- Position: —
Club
- Years: Club
- ?–?: Leixlip
Club titles
- Leinster titles: —
Inter-county
- Years: County
- 1926–1936: Kildare
Inter-county titles
- Leinster titles: 4
- All-Irelands: 2
- NFL: 0
- All Stars: N/A

Matt Goff (born Matthew Gough in Leixlip, County Kildare, 5 July 1901, died 19 March 1956) was a Gaelic footballer on the Kildare, Leinster and Irish Tailteann Games teams and one of a group of players who helped establish Gaelic Athletic Association as a sport in Ireland.

He played in six All Ireland finals between 1926 and 1935, won an unprecedented six Leinster titles in succession, and won two All Ireland medals with the Kildare team that was the first to be presented with the Sam Maguire Cup. He played with Leixlip GAA in the junior championship teams of 1921 and 1922 and the 1923 league, and came to notice on Tom Farrell’s 1924 Leixlip team that reached the 1924 Kildare junior final. He made his senior debut for Kildare against Louth in the 1926 championship and held his place in four All Ias Kildare went to final only to lose in a dramatic replay against Kerry.

As Kildare went on to play Kerryreland finals over the next six years, interest in football reached new levels. The attendance at the 1929 final, 43,839, broke the record of 41,000 established for the Ireland-Scotland football match in Belfast in 1925. He was one of four Kildare players selected on the Irish team for the 1928 Tailteann Games and played 13 times for Leinster, winning six Railway Cup medals for inter-provincial competition. He played his last of his 65 competitive appearances for Kildare in the 1936 championship against Meath. He worked as a military police officer, participating in the Stacumny ambush in the Irish War of Independence, and later with CIÉ. When he died in 1956 GAA players from all over Ireland formed a guard of honour for his coffin. The overpass bridge on the Dublin-Galway motorway at Leixlip was named in his honour on 18 March 2006.
