= Two Mile House GAA =

Gaelic games club in County Kildare, Ireland

Two Mile House
- Teach Dhá Míle
- Founded: 1887
- County: Kildare
- Nickname: 'The House'
- Grounds: Harristown Common
- Coordinates: 53.162°N 6.691°W

Playing kits
Standard colours

Two Mile House Gaelic Athletic Association (GAA) club in based in Two Mile House, County Kildare, Ireland. The club's grounds are located on The Commons, just off the Dunlavin Road, in Two Mile House parish. The parish of Two Mile House is surrounded by the towns of Naas, Newbridge and Kilcullen. Two Mile House GAA club won the 2014 All-Ireland Junior Club Football Championship after defeating Fuerty of Roscommon in February 2014. In 2018, the club won the Leinster Intermediate Club Football Championship after beating Shamrocks GAA from Offaly in the final.

== Gaelic football ==
Since the late 1990s, the focus of the club had been largely on Gaelic football. As of 2026, the club men's senior football team was playing in the Intermediate Championship and League Division 2.

Some of the notable achievements of club players, at county level, include:

- Jimmy O'Connor won an All-Ireland Senior Football Championship medal with Kildare in 1919.
- Maurice Colbert (also won a Leinster minor medal), Shane Darcy and Christopher Burke are all holders of Leinster Under-21 Football Championship medals. Adam Conneely won a Leinster u20 medal in 2022.
- Peter Kelly won an All Star for the corner back position in 2010.
- Mark Sherry, Chris Healy, Adam Burke & Richard Drumgoole Maguire won a Leinster minor championship with Kildare in 2013. Mark Sherry captained the side and Chris Healy won the Man of the Match Award in the Leinster final.

== Hurling ==
The club also fields teams at several levels in underage hurling.

== Camogie ==
A camogie club, representing the area, competed in the 1950s and 1960s. It beat Caragh 5-0 to 4-2 to win the 1967 county championship. The team got to the Leinster in the 1956 inter-provincial final, and also being selected on the Kildare camogie team of the century. Two Mile House camogie club revived briefly in 1991 and had several years of underage success until the late 1990s.

== Honours ==
- Leinster Intermediate Club Football Championship: 2018
- Kildare Intermediate Football Championship: 2018
- All-Ireland Junior Club Football Championship: 2014
- Leinster Junior Club Football Championship: 2013
- Kildare Junior A Championship: 1994, 2013
- Kildare Senior Football League Division 3: 2008, 2013, 2017
- Dowling Cup: 2013
- Jack Higgins Cup: 2013
- Pat Healy Memorial Trophy: 2014
- Keogh Cup: 2026
- The Leinster Leader Junior Club Cup: 2000
- Kildare Junior B Football Championship: 2004
- Kildare Senior Camogie Championship: 1967

== Notable players ==
- Peter Kelly

== Bibliography ==
- Kildare GAA: A Centenary History, by Eoghan Corry, CLG Chill Dara, 1984, ISBN 0-9509370-0-2 hb ISBN 0-9509370-1-0 pb
- Kildare GAA yearbook, 1972, 1974, 1978, 1979, 1980 and 2000- in sequence especially the Millennium yearbook of 2000
- Soaring Sliothars: Centenary of Kildare Camogie 1904-2004 by Joan O'Flynn Kildare County Camogie Board.
