= Caragh GFC =

Gaelic football club in County Kildare, Ireland

Caragh
- Cearach
- Founded: 1888
- County: Kildare
- Colours: Maroon and White
- Grounds: St Farnan's Park, Downings
- Coordinates: 53.284152°N 6.762428°W

Playing kits
Standard colours

Senior Club Championships
| | All Ireland | Leinster champions | Kildare champions |
|---|---|---|---|
| Football: | 0 | 0 | 3 |
| Camogie: | 0 | 0 | 3 |

Caragh GFC, Prosperous is a Gaelic football club in Prosperous, County Kildare, Ireland, winner of three county senior football championships and the only club to play in five successive county finals, club of the year 1978 and home club of Larry Stanley, All Ireland medalist in 1919, Olympic athlete in 1924, first winner of the All-Time All-Star award for Gaelic Football and a member of the Kildare team of the millennium. Two of Kildare's winning All Ireland captains came from the club, Larry Stanley and Mick Buckley. Mick's grandson Niall played on the 1998 Kildare All Ireland team. Another county senior football title was lost on objection over a player that was "on the run" during the Civil War. Caragh and Raheens share a parish and while the Raheens grounds are in Caragh village, the Caragh grounds are in Prosperous.

== History ==
Early History 18th-19th centuries

Caragh GAA club is one of the county Kildare oldest GAA clubs. Gaelic football has been played in the area as far back as the 18th century with teams from Landenstown, Donore, Blackwood and the village of Prosperous. However many of these teams went out of existence in the 19th century and Caragh Gaelic Football Club was founded. The birth of the Gaelic Athletic Association in 1884 and the introduction of County committees in 1886 reignited the games of Gaelic football and hurling. The inaugural meeting of Prosperous & Blackwood Sir T Esmondes attracted 140 members in February 1888 under the patronage of local parish priest Father Kinsella and a British army veteran, Captain Fitzpatrick. Their rivals, Tim Healys were set up at Digby Bridge who reached the Kildare senior football semi-final in 1890. Digby Bridge Tim Healys officers John Dunne and Thomas Malone were listed as attending the 1889 convention. RIC records from 1890 show that Clongorey Campaigners had 38 members with Dan Kelly, John Murphy, Pat Fullam and James Kelly listed as officers. Clongorey reached the Senior Hurling Championship final in 1891 and but were defeated by Maynooth. In 1897 there were three clubs from the parish in the county championship - Caragh, Digby Bridge and Prosperous.

1900-1929

Dick Radley of Prosperous spearheaded the GAA revival in Kildare and Prosperous. Prosperous contested the County Senior Championship in 1901 and 1903 losing on both occasions to Clane GAA. Caragh did win the Junior Championship in 1907 defeating Athy GAA. Blacktrench who were formed in 1915 won the junior championship of 1916 with Larry Stanley as a key member of the side. In 1917 Caragh won the Junior Championship after three matches defeating Maddenstown 2–3 to 1–8. Caragh and Blacktrench amalgamated in 1918 and Raheens was also formed. 1918 was also the same year that Caragh won their first Senior championship captained by Larry Stanley who also lead Kildare to Leinster and All Ireland success. Caragh reached the Senior finals of 1919 defeating Kilcock GAA 2–4 to 2–1. They were defeated by Naas GAA in 1920 1–6 to 0–8. In 1921 Caragh drew with St. Conleths 1-12 each. The match was played during Irish Civil War and St. Conleth's were awarded title on objection because one of the Caragh players called C. McCarthy gave a false name as he was 'on the run' from Free State troops at the time. They were defeated by Naas in the Senior Championship final of 1922. Caragh are the only club to have played in five successive county finals from 1918 to 1923, winning two of them losing a third on objection and a fourth to a Naas goal scored before the backs had returned to their positions. Caragh qualified for the 1925 county final having lost two and drawn one of the three matches they played, losing a replay against Athy by 2–3 to 1-3 and the semifinal against Roseberry by 12 points. They won both matches on objections and qualified. They won their third county title in 1926. Caragh were the first winners of the Leinster Leader cup when it was presented in 1920. Larry and Jim Stanley, Mick Buckley and Jack Dunne, a veteran of Kildare’s 1903 All Ireland team, backboned the team.

1930-1959

It wasn't until 1931 that the club was to enjoy further success winning the Intermediate Championship defeating Athy in the final. A combined Raheens/Caragh selection, entered the 1932 championship as St. Peter's losing to Carbury GAA. Their next success came in 1949 defeating Ballymore Eustace GAA in the Junior Championship 4–9 to 2–7. The club opened their current home ground St. Farnans Park in 1951. An official opening ceremony was held and the grounds blessed by Father Mark Minma C.C.. Kildare GAA chairman Liam Geraghty and club secretary Tim Clarke oversaw the event. Raheens and Caragh again agreed to amalgamate in 1953 under the name Young Emmets. In 1954 Young Emmets won the Intermediate Championship and were promoted to Senior status. However, the partnership only lasted two more years and in 1956 Caragh and Raheens became a separate entities again. Camogie was introduced in 1955. The team was registered in the colours grey and red. Caragh won the county championship in 1958 but were not able to field a team again until 1962

1960-1989

In 1962 the Camogie team was reorganised by Betty Garry. They won the senior league in 1964 and senior championship in 1965. They also won the Senior Camogie League in 1964, 1965, 1966 and 1967. They were defeated in the 1967 camogie county championship by Geraldines 5–0 to 4–2. In the mid seventies the club commenced an underage policy and hurling was also introduced at the club. The club's next success was in 1978 and again at Junior level, winning the championship having been previously defeated in the Junior Championship finals of 1976 and 1977. 1978 was a particularly successful year at the club with a new playing pitch opened as well as the club winning Club of the Year and Richie Whelan winning Club Secretary of the Year. The Under 10 and Under 14 teams won their respective Championships however the club's Senior football team were defeated in the Championship final. The hurling team won its first league title in 1983 and in 1984 won their first championship and were successful in retaining their league title. In 1989 the under-16 team both league and championship while the minor team made the championship final. A significant portion of the club's players were members of Clane Community School's All Ireland colleges victory team. A Ladies committee was formed in the early 80s and played a large part in fundraising for the club's Clubhouse which was opened in the mid 80s. The club's centenary year was in 1988.

1990–2012

Caragh won the Junior Championship and the Jack Higgins Cup in 1993 and Intermediate Championship titles in 1995. Caragh and St. Kevins minor teams amalgamated for the 2000 season and won the Minor B league beating Balyna in the final. In 2005 Caragh won the Junior B Championship defeating Kildangan GAA The club's minor team were defeated in extra time in the 2007 league final. The Minor team did win the Minor C Championship in 2008 defeating Suncroft 4–8 to 3–9. The Caragh team managed by Donnacha Hayden won the 2010 Junior Championship defeating local rivals Robertstown in the final. The team contested the postponed 2010 Jack Higgins Cup Final in late 2011 defeating Sarsfields. In 2012 Mark Shaw took the helm and the team currently play in division 2 of the county league and the intermediate championship.

2013 – present Day

== Honours ==
- Kildare Senior Football Championship Winners (3) 1918, 1919, 1926
- Kildare Intermediate Football Championship (3) 1931, 1995, 2024
- Kildare Junior Football Championship (5) 1917, 1949, 1993, 2010, 2020
- Kildare Junior Football Championship Runners Up 2017
- Leinster Intermediate Club Football Championship (1): 2024
- Leinster Leader Cup 1920
- Kildare Intermediate Football League 1942, 1944.
- Kildare Senior Camogie Championship 1958, 1965, 1966
- Kildare Senior Camogie League 1964, 1965, 1966, 1967
- Jack Higgins Cup 1993, 2010
- Kildare Minor Football "C" Championship 2008, 2009
- Club of the century award.

== Bibliography ==
- Kildare GAA: A Centenary History, by Eoghan Corry, CLG Chill Dara, 1984, ISBN 0-9509370-0-2 hb ISBN 0-9509370-1-0 pb
- Kildare GAA yearbook, 1972, 1974, 1978, 1979, 1980 and 2000- in sequence especially the Millennium yearbook of 2000
- Soaring Sliothars: Centenary of Kildare Camogie 1904-2004 by Joan O'Flynn Kildare County Camogie Board.
- Prosperous A Village of Vision Printed by Cardinal Press Limited, Maynooth
- Caragh GFC Official Website
