= Bill Gannon (Gaelic footballer) =

Irish Gaelic footballer

William Gannon
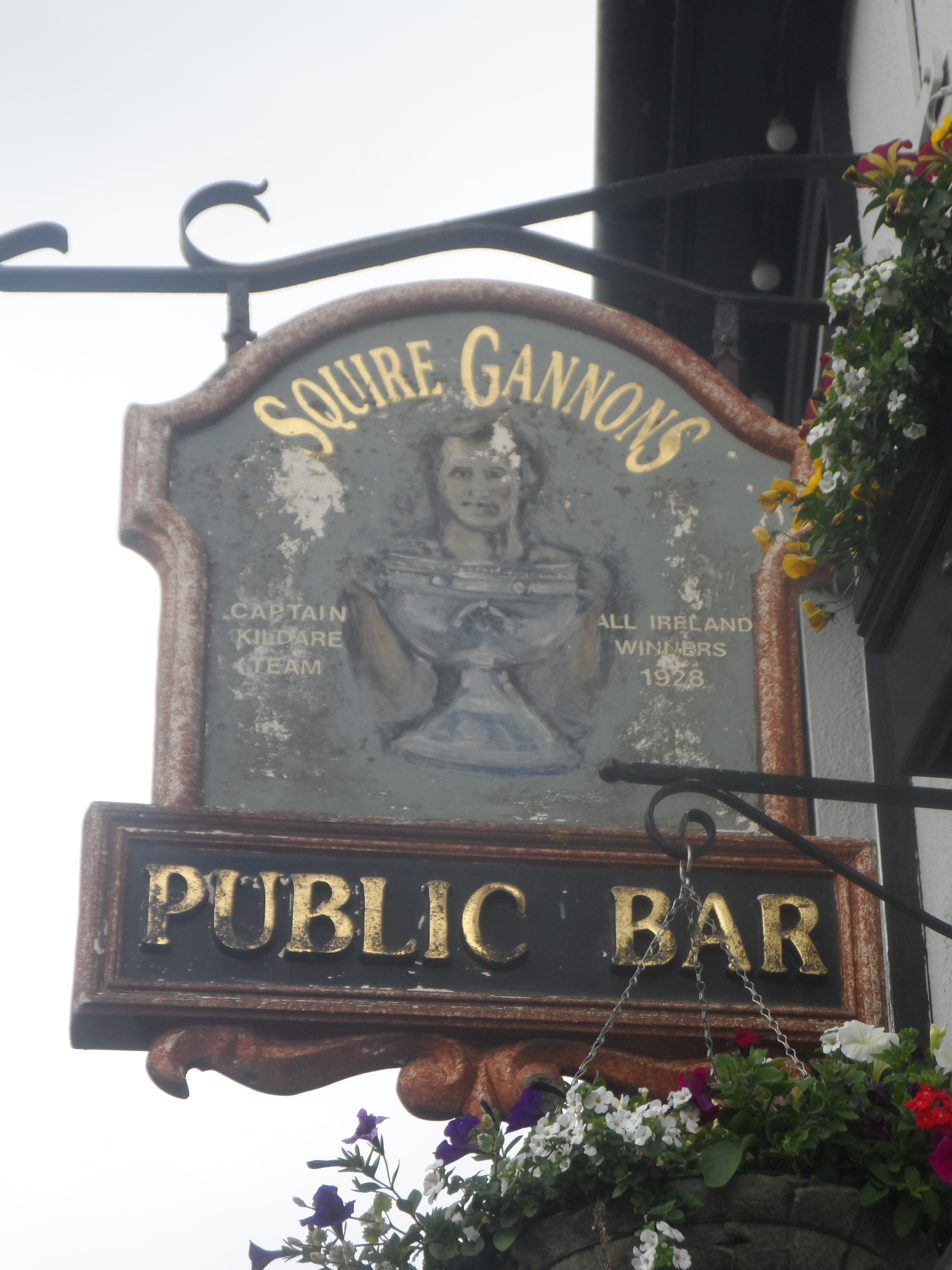
- Pub in Kildare bearing Gannon's name and likeness

Personal information
- Native name: Liam Mag Fhionnáin (Irish)
- Nickname: Squires
- Born: 28 April 1901 Newbridge, County Kildare, Ireland
- Died: 6 March 1967 (aged 65) Kildare Town, County Kildare, Ireland

Sport
- Sport: Gaelic football
- Position: Midfield
Club
- Years: Club
- Round Towers
Club titles
- Kildare titles: 3
Inter-county
- Years: County
- 1925-1929: Kildare
Inter-county titles
- Leinster titles: 4
- All-Irelands: 2
- NFL: 0

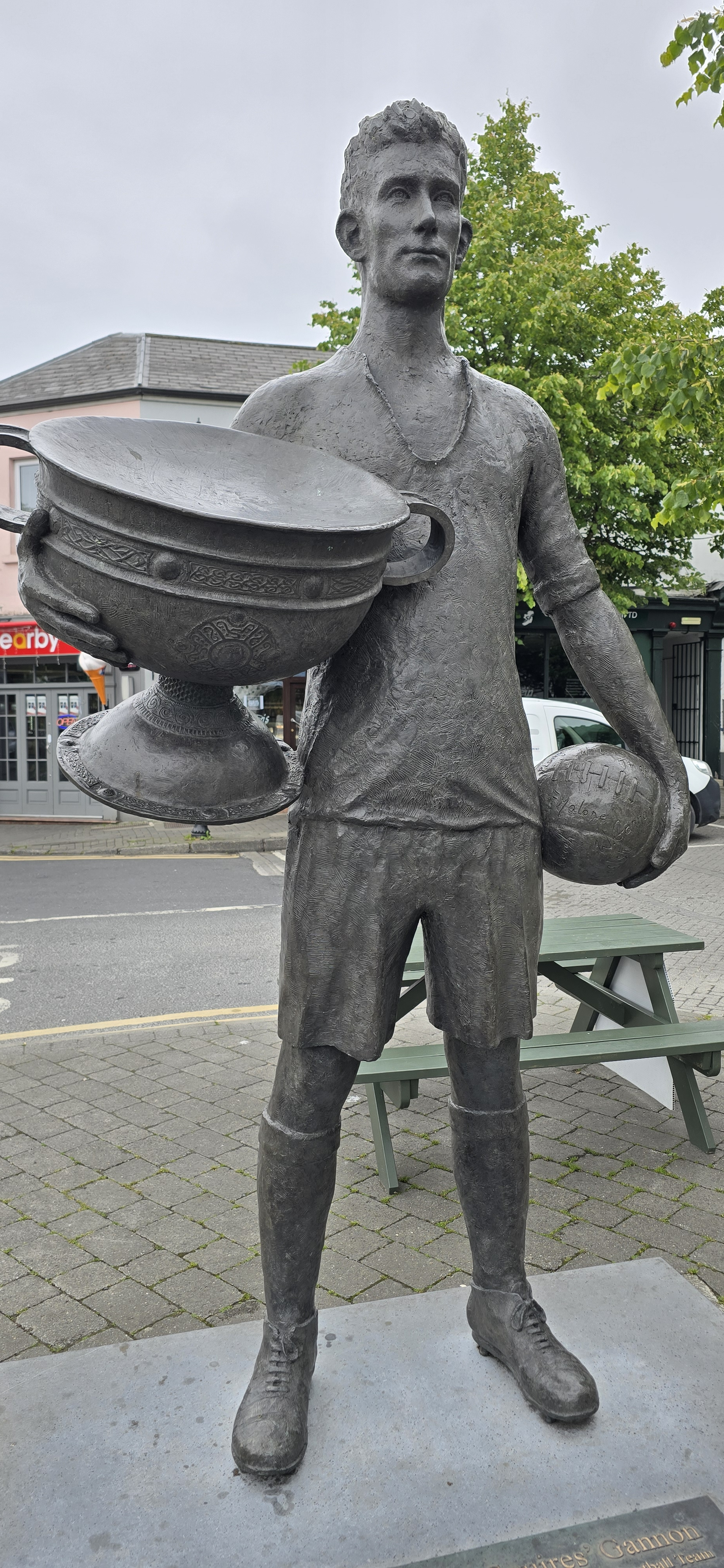
William (Bill) 'Squires' Gannon, statue in Kildare.

William "Squires" Gannon (28 April 1901 – 6 March 1967) was an Irish Gaelic footballer who played as a midfielder for the Kildare senior team.

Regarded as one of Kildare's greatest-ever players, Gannon was a regular member of the starting fifteen during the team's golden age of the 1920s. During that time he won two All-Ireland medals and four Leinster medals. An All-Ireland runner-up on two occasions, Gannon captained the team to the All-Ireland title in 1928.

At club level, Gannon was a three-time county club championship medalist with the Round Towers team.

Sporting positions
Preceded by Mick Buckley	Kildare Senior Football Captain; 1928	Succeeded by Jack Higgins
Achievements
Preceded by Mick Buckley (Kildare)	All-Ireland Senior Football Final winning captain 1928	Succeeded by Joe Barrett (Kerry)
