= Kildare Senior Camogie Championship =

Camogie championship

- Irish: Craobh Shinsir Camógaíochta Chill Dara
- Code: Camogie
- Founded: 1933
- No. of teams: 5
- Title holders: Naas (9th title)
- Most titles: Broadford (16 titles)

Camogie was played in Kildare shortly after the sport was first organized in 1904. However, due to sparse records it is not certain when the first senior camogie championship was held. The earliest record of Camogie appears in an advertisement by Athy Ladies Hurling Club advertised a members reunion in July 1909. Kildare sent delegates to the Camogie congress of 1932, and a county board was formed in 1934 with Fr Byrne CC of Caragh as President, Mrs B McCarthy as vice-president, William Fisher of Newbridge as secretary, and Polly Smyth of Newbridge as treasurer. Camogie was reorganized at a county convention in 1954, and has been played in Kildare continuously since 1957.

The champion qualifies for the Leinster Intermediate Club Camogie Championship.

== Teams ==
The following teams competed in the 2026 Kildare Senior Camogie Championship.

Team	Position in 2026	Titles	Last Title
Naas	Champion	9	2026
Celbridge	Runners-up	5	2021
Maynooth	Semi-Finals	0	–
Saint Laurence's	Semi-Finals	15	2009
Clane	5th	2	1953

== Roll of honour ==
=== By Year ===
Year	Club	Score	Opponent	Score	Source	Remarks
2026	Naas	3-13	Celbridge	3-08		
2025	Naas	4-19	Maynooth	0-03		
2024	Naas		Celbridge			
2023	Naas	1-14	Celbridge	1-08		
2022	Naas	5-12	Celbridge	2-11		
2021	Celbridge	2-11	Johnstownbridge	2-08		
2020	Celbridge	4-14	Naas	2-14		
2019	Johnstownbridge					
2018	Naas	4-06	Johnstownbridge	0-14		
2017	Johnstownbridge					Johnstownbridge became All-Ireland Intermediate Champion
2016	Johnstownbridge					Johnstownbridge became All-Ireland Junior Champion
2015	Johnstownbridge		Celbridge			Johnstownbridge became All-Ireland Junior Champion
2014	Johnstownbridge					
2013	Johnstownbridge					
2012	Johnstownbridge					
2011	Johnstownbridge					
2010	Celbridge					
2009	Saint Laurence's					
2008	Saint Laurence's					
2007	Saint Laurence's					
2006	Celbridge					
2005	Celbridge					
2004	Saint Laurence's					
2003	Saint Laurence's					
2002	Saint Laurence's					
2001	Saint Laurence's					
2000	Saint Laurence's					
1999	Saint Laurence's					
1998	Saint Laurence's					
1997	Saint Laurence's					
1996	Saint Laurence's					
1995	Saint Laurence's					
1994	Saint Laurence's					
1993	Broadford					
1992	Saint Laurence's					
1991	Saint Laurence's					
1990	Broadford					
1989	Broadford					
1988	Broadford					
1987	Broadford					
1986	Broadford					
1985	Broadford					
1984	Broadford					
1983	Broadford					
1982	Broadford					
1981	Prosperous					
1980	Prosperous					
1979	Broadford					
1978	Cappagh					
1977	Prosperous					
1976	Prosperous					
1975	Prosperous					
1974	Prosperous					
1973	Broadford					
1972	Prosperous					
1971	Broadford					
1970	Broadford					
1969	Broadford					
1968	Ardclough					
1967	Geraldines					
1966	Caragh					
1965	Caragh					
1964	Ballyroe St. Annes					
1963	Ballyroe St. Annes					
1962	Ballyroe St. Annes					
1961	Ballyroe St. Annes					
1960	Naas					
1959	Naas					
1958	Caragh					
1957	Kill					
1955-1956	No championship					
1954	Prosperous					
1953	Clane					
1943-1952	No championship					
1942	Naas					
1941	Carbury					
1940	Carbury					
1939	Clane					
1938	Stratford-on-Slaney					
1937	Carbury					
1936	Carbury					
1935	Carbury					
1934	Castledermot					
1933	Castledermot					

=== By Club ===
Club	Titles	Years
Broadford	16	1969, 1970, 1971, 1973, 1979, 1982, 1983, 1984, 1985, 1986, 1987, 1988, 1989, 1990, 1991, 1993
Saint Laurence's	15	1992, 1994, 1995, 1996, 1997, 1998, 1999, 2000, 2001, 2002, 2003, 2004, 2007, 2008, 2009
Naas	9	1942, 1959, 1960, 2018, 2022, 2023, 2024, 2025, 2026
Johnstownbridge	8	2011, 2012, 2013, 2014, 2015, 2016, 2017, 2019
Prosperous	8	1954, 1972, 1974, 1975, 1976, 1977, 1980, 1981
Celbridge	5	2005, 2006, 2010, 2020, 2021
Carbury	5	1935, 1936, 1937, 1940, 1941
Ballyroe St. Annes	4	1961, 1962, 1963, 1964
Caragh	3	1958, 1965, 1966
Clane	2	1939, 1953
Castledermot	2	1933, 1934
Cappagh	1	1978
Ardclough	1	1968
Geraldines	1	1967
Kill	1	1957
Stratford-on-Slaney	1	1938

== Bibliography ==
- Soaring Sliothars: Centenary of Kildare Camogie 1904-2004 by Joan O'Flynn Kildare County Camogie Board*
- Kildare GAA: A Centenary History, by Eoghan Corry, CLG Chill Dara, 1984, ISBN 0-9509370-0-2 hb ISBN 0-9509370-1-0 pb
