= Jack Higgins (Gaelic footballer) =

Irish Gaelic footballer

Personal information
- Native name: Seán Ó hUiginn (Irish)
- Born: 1903 Naas, County Kildare, Ireland
- Died: 23 October 1955 (aged 52) Naas, County Kildare, Ireland

Sport
- Sport: Gaelic football
- Position: Right wing-back
Club
- Years: Club
- Naas
Club titles
- Kildare titles: 6
Inter-county
- Years: County
- 1925-1935: Kildare
Inter-county titles
- Leinster titles: 7
- All-Irelands: 2
- NFL: 0

John Higgins (1903 – 23 October 1955) was an Irish Gaelic footballer who played as a right centre half-back for the Kildare senior team.

Higgins made his debut during the 1925 championship and was a regular member of the starting fifteen until his retirement a decade later. During that time he won two All-Ireland medals and seven Leinster medals. Higgins was an All-Ireland runner-up on four occasions.

At club level Higgins was a six-time county club championship medalist with Naas.

Sporting positions
Preceded by Bill "Squires" Gannon	Kildare Senior Football Captain; 1929	Succeeded by Paul Doyle
Preceded by	Kildare Senior Football Captain; 1935	Succeeded by
