= Christopher Burke (Irish revolutionary) =

Irish revolutionary (1898–1964)

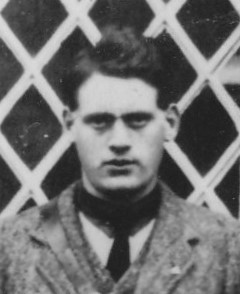
- Burke in Bailieborough, Cavan, c. 1920
- Born: 4 August 1898; Drogheda, County Louth, Ireland
- Died: 23 June 1964 (aged 65); Bryanstown, County Meath, Ireland
- Relatives: Tom Burke (brother); Eamonn Duggan (cousin)

Christopher Patrick Burke (4 August 1898 – 23 June 1964) was an Irish revolutionary, hunger striker and sportsman from the prominent Drogheda family, the Burkes of Duleek Street. At just 21, he was made officer in command of the Irish Republican Army (IRA) Arsenal in Bailieborough, County Cavan, on the recommendation of General Seán Mac Eoin. During the Irish Civil War, he underwent a hunger strike lasting twenty-three days.

== Early life ==
Burke was born on 4 August 1898 on Coola Street, Drogheda, County Louth, to Christopher Patrick Burke, secretary of the gas works, and Mary McQuillan. He lived the first eight years of his life on Coola Street, and was raised in a well-off family. However, things took a turn for the worse with the death of Christopher Burke Sr. from Bright's disease on 12 October 1906 at the age of just 44. With the family's source of income gone, his mother moved with him and his five siblings to live with her siblings on Duleek Street.

== Revolutionary activities ==
Burke joined the Irish Volunteers in 1917, and after two years in its ranks, during which he was promoted to officership, the General Headquarters ordered him to sever, outwardly, his connections with the organisation, which he did. After being released from prison in the Drogheda Foundry, he was the only man in the IRA who could forge cast iron hand grenades which would fragment.

Upon his resignation, he was appointed officer in command of the IRA Arsenal in Bailieborough, County Cavan, on the recommendation of General Seán Mac Eoin, known as the "Blacksmith of Ballinalee". He retained this post under the nom de guerre of "Seán Jones", sometimes referred to as "Seaghan Mac Seaghan", until the end of hostilities against the British. He was captured on one occasion by British forces while en route to Navan by motorcycle, where he was held hostage by them. However, a few days later, an aeroplane piloted by a British officer crash landed close to an Irish Volunteer camp and he was promptly taken prisoner. Both prisoners were released in an exchange between the two forces.

It was in Bailiborough, under the command of Burke, that all of the hand-grenades that the IRA used during the War of Independence were made. By this point, the Black and Tans had arrived in Ireland. This group was made up of many British soldiers who had fought in the First World War and would go on to commit many atrocities against the Irish after becoming desensitised to violence during said war. They would travel in "half trucks" which consisted of a cab for a driver and an officer, behind which fourteen constables sat back to back in two rows.

Members of the IRA would endeavour to throw a grenade into the truck from a nearby roof when it passed. In order to save his fellow soldiers, one of them would have to jump on the hand grenade, sacrificing himself in the process. So, the British decided to put steel frames over the trucks, with netting wire over the frames, so that when grenades were thrown, they bounced off the wire. As well as this, the Black and Tans could shoot out through the wire.

This development was reported to Michael Collins, who then forwarded it on to Seán Mac Eoin, who then told Burke that his grenades were "bouncing off". After being enlightened as to what was going on with the netting wire, Burke went back to his forge, where he immediately made hand grenades with fishhooks moulded into them. When these grenades were flung at the troop transport trucks of the Black and Tans, they would catch onto the wire above the troops, meaning it was impossible for anyone to lie on them and therefore save the rest. Casualties depended on which part of the truck was hit, and on three separate occasions all fourteen Black and Tans were killed by Burke's fishhook grenades.

Burke was awarded with the "Service Medal with Bar" for his active military service during the War of Independence, also known as the "Black and Tan Medal and Bar".

Following the signing of the Anglo-Irish Treaty in 1921, Burke's cousin, Eamonn Duggan, one of the Treaty's signatories, offered him a rank in the army or police, however Burke declined on principal.

== Irish Civil War ==
When the Civil War broke out in 1922, Burke fought on the Republican side, and was in charge of the boycott of Drogheda on 28 June, wherein Anti-Treaty forces took over the town and blew up the railway bridge south of it, isolating it from Dublin. On 4 July, Free State forces attacked republican-held Drogheda. At this point, Burke and his subordinates were based in Millmount Fort, which overlooks the town, and also held the railway station. The National Army brought up mortars and 18-pounder guns to shell them, and after several hours of bombardment the Anti-Treaty forces surrendered. There was also fighting at the railway station in town, though the republicans there would surrender soon after.

After his capture by the Free State forces, Burke was imprisoned in Maryborough Gaol in Portlaoise, County Laois, where he went on a hunger strike lasting twenty-three days. As a protest against the conditions in the prison, the inmates set fire to the building and for six months following this incident had to sleep in the open. A while later, Burke was transferred along with his fellow prisoners to the Curragh Camp, known to its inmates as "Tin-town", until the general release.

== Sporting activities ==
Like his brothers, Burke was an "extremely successful" athlete, and had many trophies as a runner, footballer and hurler with St. Mary's H.C., Con Colbert's F.C., Stars F.C., Wolfe Tone F.C., John Mitchel H.C., and the Louth county team. He also had a keen interest in greyhound racing.

== Political activities ==
In 1934, Burke was elected to the Corporation of Drogheda as a Fianna Fáil candidate for the Duleek Gate Ward, and was re-elected when the council was reduced from 24 members to 12.

== Later life and death ==
In 1932, Burke was brought to court by his older brother Michael Burke after assaulting him in the family home on Duleek Street, Drogheda. The house had been left to Michael in the will of their aunt Jane McQuillan, who died in 1919, leaving the premises to him, but requiring his mother and two sisters, Mary "Maise" and Christina Mary "Tena", to be supported there. However, Burke insisted on living there, along with his brother Joseph, leading to a family dispute. On the day of the assault, there were two young boys in the house listening to a football match on the wireless radio. Michael Burke ordered them to leave, and following this, Burke came back from milking the cows. He asked Michael why he had sent the boys away from the wireless, to which he gave no response, following which Burke hit his brother six times, badly cutting his eye. Michael was attended by a Dr. McCullen, and his left eye black and swollen, while there was a slight mark on his forehead. The Justice said that the will gave Michael Burke the ownership of the house and the tenants subject to the charges set out in it. He fined Burke 5 shillings, though Michael Burke's lawyer, Mr. Tallan said he was more concerned with Christopher and Joseph Burke getting a dwelling somewhere else.

After this, Christopher Burke went into the dairy business with his brother, Joseph Burke, and built a house on the family farm in Bryanstown, County Meath. He died from coronary occlusion at the age of 65 in his home on 23 June 1964. His sister, Christina Mary "Tena" Burke was present at his death.

Christopher Burke's requiem mass was celebrated at St. Mary's Church in Drogheda. His republican comrades attended the funeral, and the Mayor of Drogheda and members of the Drogheda Corporation walked wearing their robes of office in the cortege.
