= Paul Doyle (Gaelic footballer) =

Irish Gaelic footballer

Personal information
- Nickname: White Streak
- Born: 1899 Suncroft, County Kildare, Ireland
- Died: 29 May 1953 (aged 54) Curragh Camp, County Kildare, Ireland
- Occupation: Soldier

Sport
- Sport: Gaelic football
- Position: Left corner-forward
Clubs
- Years: Club
- Suncroft; Army Metro
Club titles
- Kildare titles: 0
Inter-county
- Years: County
- 1917-1931: Kildare
Inter-county titles
- Leinster titles: 6
- All-Irelands: 3
- NFL: 0

Paul Doyle (1889 – 29 May 1953) was an Irish Gaelic footballer who played as a left corner-forward for the Kildare senior team.

Doyle made his first appearance for the team during the 1917 championship and was a regular member of the starting fifteen until his retirement after the 1931 championship. During that time he won three All-Ireland medals and six Leinster medals. Doyle was an All-Ireland runner-up on three occasions.

At club level Doyle began his career with Suncroft before later lining out with the Army Metro team.

Sporting positions
Preceded by Jack Higgins	Kildare Senior Football Captain; 1930	Succeeded by Mick Walsh
