= Frank Malone (Gaelic footballer) =

Irish Gaelic footballer

Personal information
- Native name: Prionsias Ó Maoileoin (Irish)
- Born: 1903 Naas, County Kildare, Ireland
- Died: 2 September 1953 (aged 50) Naas, County Kildare, Ireland

Sport
- Sport: Gaelic football
- Position: Left corner-back
Club
- Years: Club
- Naas
Club titles
- Kildare titles: 6
Inter-county
- Years: County
- 1926-1932: Kildare
Inter-county titles
- Leinster titles: 6
- All-Irelands: 2
- NFL: 0

Laurence F. "Frank" Malone (1903 – 2 September 1953) was an Irish Gaelic footballer who played as a left corner-back for the Kildare senior team.

Malone made his debut during the 1926 championship and was a regular member of the starting fifteen during the golden age of Kildare football. During that time he won two All-Ireland medals and six Leinster medals. Higgins was an All-Ireland runner-up on three occasions.

At club level Malone was a six-time county club championship medalist with Naas.
