= Sam Maguire Cup =

Gaelic football trophy

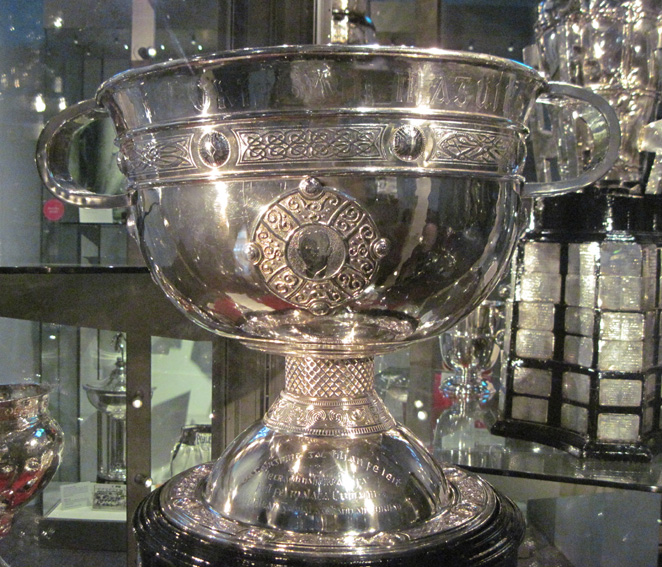
Original 1928 Sam Maguire Cup on display in the GAA Museum at Croke Park

The Sam Maguire Cup (Irish: Chorn Sam Mhic Uidhir), often referred to as Sam or The Sam, is a trophy awarded annually by the Gaelic Athletic Association (GAA) to the team that wins the All-Ireland Senior Football Championship, the main competition in the sport of Gaelic football. The Sam Maguire Cup was first presented to Kildare, winners of the 1928 All-Ireland Senior Football Championship Final. The original 1920s trophy was retired in the 1980s, with a new identical trophy awarded annually since 1988.

The GAA organises the series of games, which are played during the summer months. The All-Ireland Football Final was traditionally played on the third or fourth Sunday in September at Croke Park in Dublin. In 2018, the GAA rescheduled its calendar and since then the fixture has been played at various dates.

The trophy is made of silver and due to this being one of the softer metals it is prone to sustaining dents easily.

== Original trophy ==
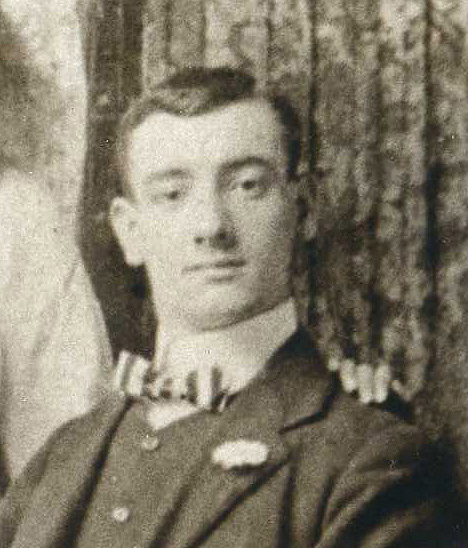
Matthew J. Staunton c.1910

The original Sam Maguire Cup commemorates the memory of Sam Maguire, an influential figure in the London GAA and a former footballer. A group of his friends formed a committee in Dublin under the chairmanship of Dr Pat McCartan from Carrickmore, County Tyrone, to raise funds for a permanent commemoration of his name. They decided on a cup to be presented to the GAA. The Association were proud to accept the Cup. At the time it cost £300. In today's terms that sum is equivalent to €25,392. The commission to make it was given to Hopkins and Hopkins, a jewellers and watchmakers of O'Connell Bridge, Dublin.

The silver cup was crafted, on behalf of Hopkins and Hopkins, by the silversmith Matthew J. Staunton of D'Olier Street, Dublin. Maitiú Standun, Staunton's son, confirmed in a letter printed in the Alive! newspaper in October 2003 that his father had indeed made the original Sam Maguire Cup back in 1928.

Matthew J. Staunton (1888–1966) came from a long line of silversmiths going back to the Huguenots, who brought their skills to Ireland in the 1600s. Matt, as he was known to his friends, served his time in the renowned Dublin silversmiths, Edmond Johnson Ltd, where the Liam MacCarthy Hurling Cup was made in 1921.

The 1928 Sam Maguire Cup is a faithful model of the Ardagh Chalice, an early Christian chalice dated to the 9th century AD. The bowl was not spun on a spinning lathe but hand-beaten from a single flat piece of silver. Even though it is highly polished, multiple hammer marks are still visible today, indicating the manufacturing process.

It was first presented in 1928 - to the Kildare team that defeated Cavan by one point in that year's final. #

Kerry won the trophy on the most occasions. They were also the only team to win it in four consecutive years, doing so twice - first during the late-1920s and early-1930s (1929, 1930, 1931, 1932), and later during the late-1970s and early 1980s (1978, 1979, 1980, 1981).

Six men won the old trophy twice as captain: Joe Barrett of Kerry, Jimmy Murray of Roscommon, John Joe O'Reilly of Cavan, Seán Flanagan of Mayo, Enda Colleran of Galway and Tony Hanahoe of Dublin.

The Sam Maguire Cup briefly vanished from the safe in which it was being stored for safe keeping in New York in April 1981, having been brought there reluctantly by the then Feale Rangers and Kerry captain Jimmy Deenihan when his club were touring in the United States. Deenihan had been asked to bring it with him so that it could be photographed alongside the baseball "World Series" Commissioner's Trophy and the American football "Super Bowl" Vince Lombardi Trophy. The incident was covered on the front page of the Irish Independent and Deenihan recounted the episode in his book My Sporting Life, stating he subsequently retrieved the Sam Maguire Cup following the intervention of the New York County Board and with the aid of an FBI officer.

The original trophy was retired in 1988 as it had received some damage over the years. It is permanently on display in the GAA Museum at Croke Park.

== New trophy ==
The GAA commissioned a replica from Kilkenny-based silversmith Desmond A. Byrne and the replica is the trophy that has been used since. The silver for the new cup was donated by Johnson Matthey Ireland at the behest of Kieran Eustace, the managing director. Meath's Joe Cassells was the first recipient of "Sam Óg". Meath were the last team to lift the old Sam Maguire and the first team to lift the new one following their back-to-back victories in 1987 and 1988.

In 2010, the GAA asked the same silversmith to produce another replica of the trophy, although this was to be used only for marketing purposes.

Tyrone's former county board chairman Cuthbert Donnelly was tasked with guarding the Sam Maguire Cup following his county's All-Ireland SFC wins of 2003, 2005, 2008 and 2021. Donnelly had a special case made so as to store the trophy safely when it was being transported over long distances. When Donnelly returned it in "pristine condition" to Des Byrne, the Kilkenny silversmith who had created it, Byrne gifted Donnelly a silver memento, so impressed was he by Donnelly's efforts at preventing damage to the trophy.

The Dublin team briefly lost the trophy in New York in 2018 but subsequently retrieved it.

== Winners ==
See All-Ireland Senior Football Championship for a list of all-time winners of the competition.

=== Old Trophy ===
| Colors | Club | Years won |
|---|---|---|
| | Kerry | 1929, 1930, 1931, 1932, 1937, 1939, 1940, 1941, 1946, 1953, 1955, 1959, 1962, 1969, 1970, 1975, 1978, 1979, 1980, 1981, 1984, 1985, 1986 |
| | Dublin | 1942, 1958, 1963, 1974, 1976, 1977, 1983 |
| | Galway | 1934, 1938, 1956, 1964, 1965, 1966 |
| | Cavan | 1933, 1935, 1947, 1948, 1952 |
| | Meath | 1949, 1954, 1967, 1987 |
| | Mayo | 1936, 1950, 1951 |
| | Down | 1960, 1961, 1968 |
| | Offaly | 1971, 1972, 1982 |
| | Roscommon | 1943, 1944 |
| | Cork | 1945, 1973 |
| | Kildare | 1928 |
| | Louth | 1957 |

=== New Trophy ===
| Colors | Club | Years won |
|---|---|---|
| | Dublin | 1995, 2011, 2013, 2015, 2016, 2017, 2018, 2019, 2020, 2023 |
| | Kerry | 1997, 2000, 2004, 2006, 2007, 2009, 2014, 2022, 2025 |
| | Tyrone | 2003, 2005, 2008, 2021 |
| | Meath | 1988, 1996, 1999 |
| | Cork | 1989, 1990, 2010 |
| | Down | 1991, 1994 |
| | Donegal | 1992, 2012 |
| | Galway | 1998, 2001 |
| | Armagh | 2002, 2024 |
| | Derry | 1993 |
| | Mayo | 2026 |

== See also ==
- List of All-Ireland Senior Football Championship winning captains
- Brendan Martin Cup, in ladies' Gaelic football
- Liam MacCarthy Cup, in hurling
