= Kildare GAA =

County board of the Gaelic Athletic Association in Ireland

- Irish: Cill Dara
- Province: Leinster
- Dominant sport: Dual County
- Ground(s): St Conleth's Park, Newbridge
- County colours: White

County teams
- NFL: Division 2
- NHL: Division 1B
- Football Championship: Sam Maguire Cup
- Hurling Championship: Liam MacCarthy Cup
- Ladies' Gaelic football: Brendan Martin Cup
- Camogie: Jack McGrath Cup

The Kildare County Board of the Gaelic Athletic Association (GAA), or Kildare GAA, is one of 12 county boards governed by the Leinster provincial council of the GAA in Ireland, and is responsible for the administration of Gaelic games in County Kildare. The Lillies are one of only 4 counties who will play at the top level of both Hurling and Football for the 2026 campaign.

The County Board is responsible for preparing the Kildare county teams in the various Gaelic sporting codes; football, hurling and camogie.

The county football team won the All-Ireland Senior Football Championship (SFC) on four occasions in less than 25 years at the beginning of the 20th century and had accumulated ten Leinster Senior Football Championships by 1935; however, it then went into decline. It last reached an All-Ireland SFC final in 1998 after a gap of 63 years without an appearance in the decider. They then went on to win 5 straight senior titles from 2005-2010.

== Colours and crest ==
The old Kildare GAA crest, showing oak trees, acorns and lily flower was replaced by the current crest in 2005.

The Kildare crest had a serpent on it until 1993, reflecting that of Kildare County Council, itself based on the crest for the town of Naas. When Kildare County Council had the Heraldic Office of Ireland create a proper crest in 1991, and with Kildare fans regarding the serpent as a bad omen, the Kildare Supporters' Club requested a new one for their county teams; this featured acorns above a bunch of lilies (the county council one differed in that it had a Brigid's cross, a harp, a horse's head and acorns). Kildare still lost in the first round of the Leinster Senior Football Championship (SFC) for three years afterwards, from 1994 until 1996.

Kildare introduced a new crest in 2005 in line with many other county boards who swapped out traditional crests for slightly different or modernised versions which they could claim a copyright. The new crest is a stylised Brigid's cross with the county name below in both Irish and, rarely for a GAA board, English.

== History ==
Gaelic games predate recorded sporting history in Kildare. Hurling on Lyons Hill was featured in the Book of Leinster. The Curragh of Kildare was the venue for the fairs and festivals of ancient Ireland called the Aonach Colmáin. Local references to football go back to medieval times. An English traveller, John Dundon, described a hurling match in Naas in 1699. A handball alley near Rathangan bears the date 1790, though the oldest known alley is located near Moone. A match at Timolin in February 1792, resulted in a riot that was reported in local newspapers. There is also a reference to an inter-county match between Kildare and Meath GAA in 1797 which was attended by Lord Edward Fitzgerald. Valentine Lawless, Lord of Cloncurry, describes how Wogan Browne, an 18th-century grandee, lost his Justice of the Peace status for kicking off a football match in the Clane area, also in 1797.

Summer athletics meetings in Kildare predate the GAA. John Wyse Power, then editor of local newspaper The Leinster Leader, attended the foundation meeting of the Gaelic Athletic Association (GAA) in Thurles in 1884. In February 1885, Sallins GAA, Straffan GAA, Naas GAA and the Suncroft GAA played in the first four football matches governed under new GAA rules.

A county committee was established in 1887. Kildare entered the second championships in 1888 and was represented by Clane GAA. Tommy Conneff from Clane, who went on to hold the world record for the mile, was among the first GAA athletic champions.

== County board structure ==
The Kildare County Board, which meets once a month in St Conleth's Park, is the highest authority within the county. It is responsible for running all adult football competitions, the Under 21 championships, and minor leagues and championships. Every club sends one delegate. There is a separate board responsible for hurling, which is a subsidiary board to the county board.

Juvenile hurling and football is administered by Bord na nÓg which runs Under 14, 15 and 16 competitions. Under 13 and younger grades are separated into a North Board and South Board.

== Football ==
=== Clubs ===
Kildare is very much a footballing county, with 105 teams from 45 clubs competing in the Senior, Intermediate and Junior Football Leagues. The highest-achieving club is Sarsfields (Newbridge) with 25 (9 as their former name Roseberry). Clane won 17 titles. Raheens won 10; Carbury, 11; Round Towers from Kildare Town, 10 (counting three won as Kildare Town and one as St Patrick's); Naas, 9; Moorefield (Newbridge), 8; Athy, 5; Kilcock, 5; Ellistown, 4 (counting 2 won as Mountrice); Johnstownbridge, 3; Caragh, 3; Monasterevin, 3; Maynooth, 2; and Allenwood, Ardclough, Ballymore, Celbridge, Curragh, Eadestown, Military College, Rathangan, Newbridge CYMS club St Conleth's (on objection) and St Laurence's won one each. Raheens and Moorefield are the only Kildare sides to win a Leinster club title (in 1981 and 2006 and Moorefield again in 2017

Club	Irish Name
Allenwood	Fiodh Aluine
Ardclough	Árd Cloch
Athgarvan	Áth Garbháin
Athy	Athí
Ballykelly	Bealach Eile
Ballymore Eustace	Baile Mór
Ballyteague	Baile Thaidhg
Cappagh	Ceapach
Carragh	Cearrach
Carbury	Cairbre
Castledermot	Díseart Diarmada
Castlemitchell	Caisleán an Mhistéalaigh
Celbridge	Cill Droichid
Clane	Claonadh
Clogherinkoe	Clocha Rince
Confey	Confaí
Eadestown	Baile Éide
Ellistown	Baile Eilis
Grangenolvin	An Gráinseach
Johnstownbridge	Droichead Baile Sheain
Kilcock	Cill Choca
Kilcullen	Cill Chuilinn
Kildangan	Cill Daingin
Kill	An Chill
Leixlip	Léim an Bhradáin
Maynooth	Máigh Nuad
Milltown	Baile an Mhuillinn
Monasterevin	Mainistir Eimhín
Moorefield	Achadh Mhordha
Naas	Nás na Ríogh
Nurney	An Urnaí
Raheens	Raithíní
Rathangan	Rath Iomgháin
Rathcoffey	Rath Cobhthaigh
Rheban	Rebán
Robertstown	Baile Roibeard
Round Towers	Na Cloighithe
Sallins	Na Solláin
Sarsfields	Na Sáirséalaigh
St Kevins	Naomh Caoimhín
St Laurences	Naomh Lorcan
Straffan	Teach Sratain
Suncroft	Crocha na Gréine
Two Mile House	Teach an Dá Mhíle

=== County team ===
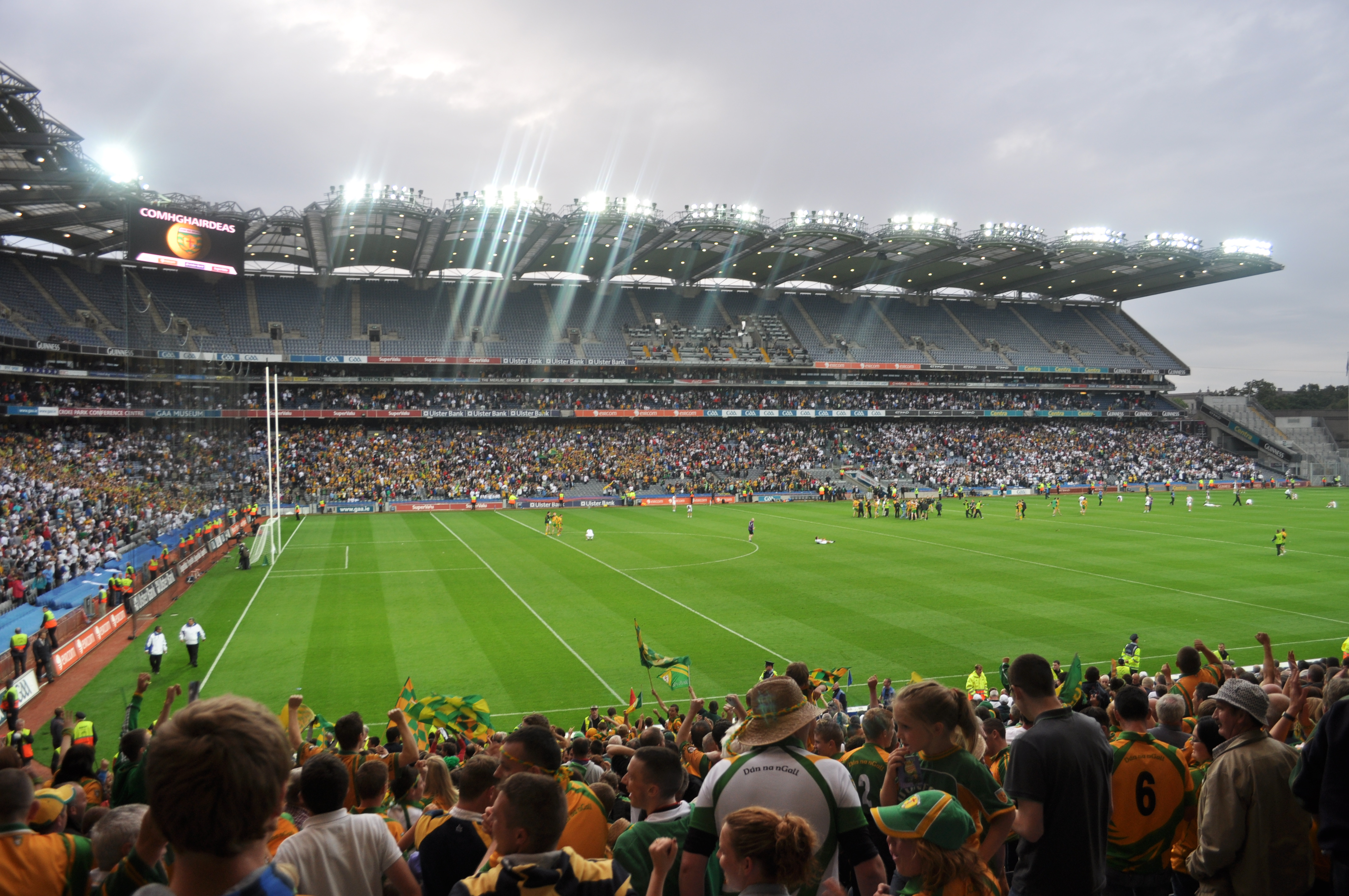
Donegal defeated Kildare after extra time in the 2011 All-Ireland Senior Football Championship quarter-final.

Kildare first competed in the All-Ireland Senior Football Championship in 1888, losing to Dublin by 2–7 to 0–1.

The county played an important role in the early development of Gaelic football. Kildare was the first county to reduce its team from 21 players to 16 before the modern 15-a-side game was adopted. Kildare players are also credited with developing the hand pass, while the toe-to-hand technique was pioneered by the Roseberry club (now Sarsfields). A combined Roseberry and Clane team faced Kerry three times in the 1903 All-Ireland Championship. The matches attracted a combined attendance of around 50,000 and are widely regarded as having significantly increased the popularity of Gaelic football.

Kildare won four All-Ireland Senior Football Championship titles between 1905 and 1928, defeating Kerry in 1905 and 1927, Galway in 1919, and Cavan in the 1928 final. They also became the first county to lift the Sam Maguire Cup in 1928.

Those successful teams helped refine the hand-passing game while also becoming known for their fielding ability and catch-and-kick style. Olympic high jumper Larry Stanley was regarded as one of the finest fielders of his era.

Although Kildare won the Leinster Senior Football Championship in 1956, reached National League finals in 1958 and 1968, and claimed the All-Ireland Under-21 Football Championship in 1965, sustained provincial success proved elusive. The county lost six Leinster finals between 1966 and 1978. At club level, Raheens won the Leinster Senior Club Football Championship in 1983.

Former Kerry manager Mick O'Dwyer took charge in 1991. During his first spell, Kildare reached the 1991 National League final and consecutive Leinster finals in 1992 and 1993, losing each to Dublin. O'Dwyer returned in 1997 and guided Kildare to another Leinster title after memorable victories over Laois and Meath.

In 1998, Kildare became the first team to defeat the previous three All-Ireland champions—Dublin, Meath and Kerry—in a single championship campaign. They reached the All-Ireland final but lost to Galway after leading by three points at half-time. Another Leinster title followed in 2000, although Galway again ended Kildare's championship campaign in the All-Ireland semi-final. Leinster final defeats followed in 2002 and 2003 against Dublin and Laois. In 2005, Kildare finished among the top six in the National Football League but were eliminated from the championship by Sligo.

Under manager Kieran McGeeney, Kildare reached consecutive All-Ireland quarter-finals between 2008 and 2010. Although they suffered a surprise defeat to Wicklow in the 2008 Leinster Championship, they recovered through the qualifiers to reach the county's first All-Ireland quarter-final under the back-door system. In 2009, Kildare again reached the Leinster final before losing to Dublin and later exited the championship at the quarter-final stage against Tyrone. In 2010, after another qualifier run, Kildare defeated Meath in the All-Ireland quarter-final to reach their first semi-final since 2000, where they lost to Down.

In 2011, Kildare defeated Meath, Laois and Derry before losing after extra time to Donegal in the All-Ireland quarter-final.

Cian O'Neill was appointed manager in 2015 after serving on the Kerry coaching staff. Under his management, Kildare reached their first Leinster final in a decade in 2017, where they were defeated by Dublin. In 2018, Kildare were at the centre of the "Newbridge or Nowhere" controversy after successfully insisting that their All-Ireland qualifier against Mayo be played at St Conleth's Park, rather than being moved to Croke Park. Kildare went on to defeat Mayo and later overcame Fermanagh to qualify for the inaugural "Super 8s". O'Neill stepped down as manager following the 2019 season.

== Hurling ==
=== Clubs ===
Kildare's most successful clubs have been Naas, Coill Dubh, Éire Óg/Corrachoill, Ardclough and Celbridge. Kildare's youngest club, Confey, became the reigning Senior Hurling Championship in 2007, winning over Coill Dubh in the final.

Ardclough beat Buffer's Alley in the 1976 Leinster club championship, following Ardclough player Johnny Walsh's replacement All Star award for his county heroics earlier that year (see below).

Club	Irish Name
Ardclough	Árd Cloch
Athy	Athí
Broadford	Gearr Eiscir
Castledermot	Díseart Diarmada
Celbridge	Cill Droichid
Clane	Claonadh
Coill Dubh	Coill Dubh
Confey	Confai
Eire Og Corra Choill	Eire Og Corra Choill
Kilcock	Cill Choca
Leixlip	Léim an Bhradáin
Maynooth	Máigh Nuad
Moorefield	Achadh Mhordha
Naas	Nás na Ríogh
Raheens	Raithíní
Rathcoffey	Rath Cobhthaigh
Rosglas	Ros Glas
Round Towers	Na Cloigtithe
St Laurence's	Naomh Lorcán
Suncroft	Crocha na Gréine
Wolfe Tones*	Bhulf Tón

- formed by an amalgamation of Kill and Sallins Gaa clubs.

=== County team ===
Kildare Hurlers won their first Joe McDonagh Cup in 2025 beating Laois 2-26 to 1-19 in Croke Park. Kildare hurlers came within minutes of reaching a Leinster Senior Hurling Championship (SHC) final in 1976, holding a four-point lead over eventual All-Ireland SHC finalists Wexford until the closing stages of the semi-final. That performance earned Johnny Walsh a replacement All Star award.

The county's major hurling successes were four All-Ireland Senior B titles (last in 2004), an intermediate All-Ireland (1969), and two junior All-Irelands (1962 and 1966). The closest it came to playing in the top division of the National Hurling League was when it lost a four-point lead in the last ten minutes of a Division 1B promotion play-off against Clare in 1971. Kildare defeated Waterford in the league in two successive years, was tied at half-time against Tipperary in the 1971 National League quarter-final, and lost to the same team by six points in the quarter-final of 1976. Kildare also lost a promotion play-off against Waterford in 1974.

In the 21st-century, Kildare won five Christy Ring Cups: in 2014, 2018, 2020, 2022 and 2024.

== Camogie ==
Camogie was played in Kildare since the sport was first organised in 1904, although records are sparse. Athy Ladies Hurling Club advertised a members reunion in July 1909. Newbridge, Naas, Blacktrench, Prosperous and Ballymore applied unsuccessfully for affiliation to Kildare GAA board in 1921. Kildare sent delegates to the camogie congress of 1932, and a county board was formed in 1934 with Fr Byrne CC of Caragh as president, Mrs B McCarthy as vice-president, William Fisher of Newbridge as secretary, and Polly Smyth of Newbridge as treasurer. Camogie was reorganized at a county convention in 1954, and has been played in Kildare continuously since.

Kildare's contested the All-Ireland Senior Camogie Championship semi-final in 1933 and contested the Leinster Senior final in 1939 (which was hosted in Kill), and 1947 at Inchicore. They last competed in the senior championship in 1992 and 1993.

After a series of successes at the junior level, Kildare was defeated by Cork in the National League semi-final of 1992, despite their best performance at senior level. Kildare teams played in navy and white (1930s), brown and white (1955–60) and blue and white (sporadically since the 1960s). White was adopted as the county color in April 1963.

Kildare won the Nancy Murray Cup in 2010, having previously won the Kay Mills Cup in 1987, 1989 and 1990, their best period in the game. They also won the second division of the National Camogie League in 2004. They had previously won the second division title in 1986, 1989 and 1990. Kildare contested senior finals in the Leinster championship, notably in 1939, and Ardclough contested the Leinster senior club final in 1968.

Notable players include Broadford players Miriam Malone, who played from the 1960s to the 1980s and won a Junior Player of the Year award in 1989, Gradam Tailte winner Bernie Farrelly, and scoring forwards Marianne Johnson, and Susie O'Carroll from Celbridge who captained UCD to Ashbourne Cup honours and won a Soaring Star award in 2009. Carbury Johnstownbridge and Celbridge all won divisional camogie honours at Féile na nGael. Joan O'Flynn from Celbridge served as president of the Camogie Association. Gloria Lee refereed the All Ireland senior final of 1963 and John Pender that of 2005.

Under Camogie's National Development Plan 2010–2015, "Our Game, Our Passion", five new camogie clubs were to be established in the county by 2015.

=== Honours ===
- 4 All-Ireland Junior Camogie Championships
  - 1987, 1989, 1990, 2013
- 1 Nancy Murray Cup
  - 2010
- 4 National Camogie League Division Two (junior) winners
  - 1986, 1989, 1990, 2004
- 2 National Camogie League Division Three winner
  - 2012, 2019
- 1 National Camogie League Division Four winners
  - 2009
- Once semi-finalists in the National Camogie League National League Division 1
  - 1992
- Once finalists in the All-Ireland Intermediate Camogie Championship
  - 1994
- 11 Leinster Junior Camogie Championships
  - 1961, 1966, 1967 (all Smyco cup), 1969, 1981, 1986, 1987, 1988, 1989, 1990, 1996
- 2 Leinster Under-14 B Championships
  - 1997, 2003
- 1 Minor Special Blitz
  - 2008

=== Kildare Senior Camogie Championship Roll of Honour ===
For more details on this topic, see here

=== Team of the Century ===
Anna Dargan (Broadford), Geraldine Dwyer (Athy, Prosperous & Clane), Teresa Lynch (Rathcoffey & Prosperous), Bridget Cushen (Celbridge & Ardclough), Nuala Malone (Rathcoffey & Prosperous), Melanie Treacy (Ballyboden St Enda's, Dublin & Bishopstown, Cork), Phyllis Hurst (Broadford), Miriam Malone (Broadford), Eileen Reilly (Rathcoffey & Prosperous), Michelle Aspell (Kilcullen & St Laurence's), Bernie Farrelly (Crumlin & Broadford), Patricia Keatley (St Laurence's & Broadford), Marianne Johnson (Prosperous & Clane), Clare Monahan (Naas & Two Mile House), Gloria Lee (Naas).

== Ladies' football ==
The Kildare Ladies' County Board was set up in March 1992 under the Chairmanship of Catherine Donohoe. At that time there were two clubs playing in the county, Kilcock and Leixlip, and these were joined by the newly formed Eadestown club. Michael Delaney of Leixlip was elected chairman on 10 February 1993.

Kildare's ladies' football is administered by a separate county board structured as follows (2013 Executive);
Chairman: Arthur Corrigan (Naas)
Vice-Chair: MJ Smith (Carbury)
Secretary: Gillian Dunne (St Laurences),
PRO: Jackie Whelan (Castledermot)
Treasurer: Sharon Dooley (Suncroft)

=== Honours ===
Kildare Ladies' won the Leinster Junior championship in 2000, beating Laois by 2–13 to 2–5. Kildare contested three All Ireland junior finals before eventually beating Sligo to qualify for senior status in 2004. Grangenolvin dominated club competition in the sport, in which they won five in a row at the time the championship was elevated to senior status. Brianne Leahy became the first female All Star from Kildare in 1999. In 2015 Kildare took the decision to re-grade to Intermediate level after spending 10 years without success at Senior Level. This brought a new impetus to Kildare Ladies Football where the captured 2 Leinster Intermediate Championships which moving on to win the all Ireland against Clare by a point in 2017. Mary Hulgraine the Kildare goalkeeper was rewarded for her performance by picking up an all-star.

- 2 All-Ireland Intermediate Ladies' Football Championship
  - 2016, 2023
- 1 All-Ireland Junior Ladies' Football Championship
  - 2004
- 2 All-Ireland Leinster Intermediate Ladies' Football Championship
  - 2016, 2017

== Bibliography ==
- Kildare GAA: A Centenary History, by Eoghan Corry, CLG Chill Dara, 1984, ISBN 0-9509370-0-2 hb ISBN 0-9509370-1-0 pb
- Kildare GAA yearbook, 1972, 1974, 1978, 1979, 1980, 1994 and 2000– in sequence especially the Millennium yearbook of 2000
- Soaring Sliothars, Centenary of Kildare Camogie 1904–2004 by Joan O'Flynn Kildare County Camogie Board.
