= J. Martin Burke =

American legal scholar

J. Martin Burke is an American legal scholar and Regents Professor Emeritus of Law at the University of Montana.

== Books ==
- Burke, J. Martin; Friel, Michael K. (2018). Introduction to the Taxation of Business Organizations and Choice of Entity. Durham, NC: Carolina Academic Press. ISBN 978-1-5310-0423-1.
- ——; Friel, Michael K. (2004). Taxation of Individual Income (7th ed.). Newark, NJ: LexisNexis. ISBN 0-8205-6118-5.
- ——; Friel, Michael K. (2016). Taxation of Partnerships and Limited Liability Companies Taxed as Partnerships. ISBN 978-1-4224-1708-9.
- ——; Friel, Michael K. (2005). Understanding Federal Income Taxation (2nd ed.). ISBN 0-8205-6332-3.
