= Bobby Burke (footballer) =

Northern Irish footballer (born 1934)

Personal information
- Full name: Robert Burke
- Date of birth: 5 November 1934 (age 91)
- Place of birth: Ballymena, Northern Ireland
- Position: Forward

Senior career*
Years	Team	Apps	(Gls)
	Albertville United	?	(?)
1955–1958	Burnley	19	(5)
	Chester City	?	(?)
	Ballymena United	?	(?)
- * Club domestic league appearances and goals

Robert Gallee Burke (born 5 November 1934) is a Northern Irish former professional footballer who played as an inside forward.
