= Brigid of Kildare =

Irish abbess and saint (c. 451 – c. 525)

Saint Brigid
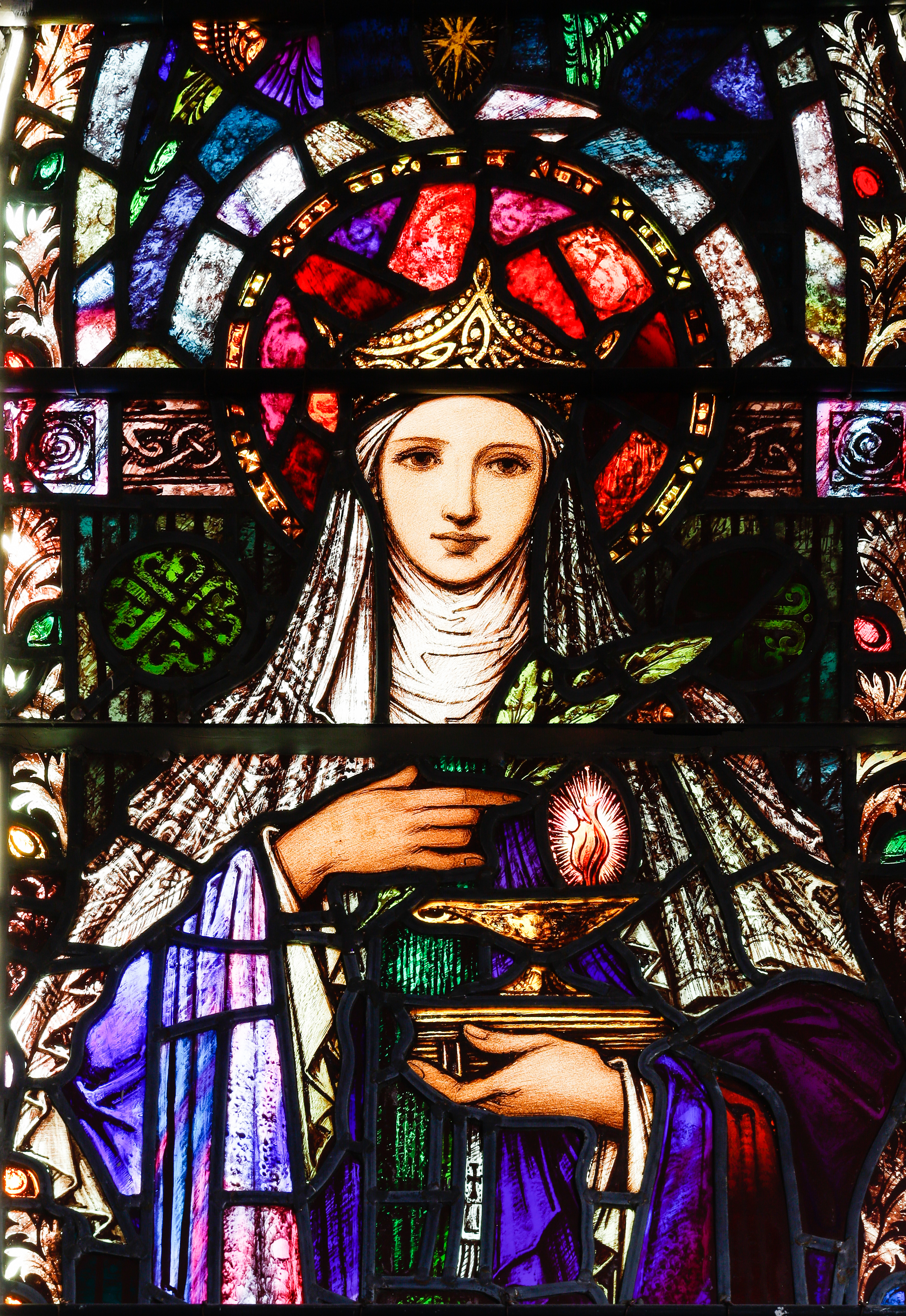
- Saint Brigid of Ireland in stained glass at St Mary of the Rosary Church in Cong, Ireland

Virgin
- Born: c. 451; Faughart, Gaelic Ireland
- Died: c. 525; Kildare, Kingdom of Leinster, Ireland
- Venerated in: Catholic Church; Anglican Communion; Eastern Orthodox Church
- Feast: 1 February
- Attributes: Brigid's cross; crozier of an abbess; flames or lamp; cow or geese
- Patronage: Kildare; Ireland; healers; poets; blacksmiths; livestock and dairy workers

Brigid of Kildare or Brigid of Ireland (Irish: Naomh Bríd; Classical Irish: Brighid; Latin: Brigida; c. 451 – c. 525) is the patroness saint (or 'mother saint') of Ireland, and one of its three national saints along with Patrick and Columba. According to medieval Irish hagiographies, she was an abbess who founded the important abbey of Kildare (Cill Dara), as well as several other convents of nuns. There is little historical evidence of her. Her hagiographies primarily focus on her miracles, and many stories about her have their basis in Irish pagan folklore. They say Brigid was the daughter of an Irish clan chief and an enslaved Christian woman, and was fostered in a druid's household before becoming a consecrated virgin. She is patroness of many things, including poetry, learning, healing, protection, blacksmithing, livestock, and dairy production. In her honour, a perpetual fire was kept burning at Kildare for centuries.

Some historians suggest that Brigid is a Christianisation of the Celtic goddess Brigid. The saint's feast day is 1 February, and traditionally it involves weaving Brigid's crosses and many other folk customs. It was originally a festival called Imbolc, marking the beginning of spring. Since 2023, it has been a public holiday in the Republic of Ireland. This feast day is shared by Dar Lugdach, who tradition says was her student, close companion, and successor.

== Name ==
The saint has the same name as the goddess Brigid, derived from the Proto-Celtic *Brigantī, "high, exalted", and ultimately originating with Proto-Indo-European *bʰerǵʰ-. In Old Irish, her name was spelled Brigit and pronounced [ˈbʲɾʲiɣʲid̠ʲ]. In Modern Irish she is also called Bríd. In Welsh, she is called Ffraid (sometimes lenited to Fraid), such as in several places called Llansanffraid, "St. Brigit's church". She is also referred to as "the Mary of the Gael", "the Mary of Ireland" and the "Mother Saint of Ireland". A less common name is "Brigid of Faughart", after her traditional birthplace.

== Historicity ==
There is debate over whether Brigid was a real person. According to The Oxford Dictionary of Saints, there are few historical facts about her – the early hagiographies "are mainly anecdotes and miracle stories, some of which are deeply rooted in Irish pagan folklore". There are many supernatural events and folk customs associated with her. She has the same name as the Celtic goddess Brigid. Like the saint, the goddess in Irish myth is associated with poetry, healing, protection, smithcraft, and domestic animals, according to Sanas Cormaic and Lebor Gabála Érenn. Furthermore, the saint's feast day falls on the Gaelic traditional festival of Imbolc. Some scholars suggest that the saint was not a real person but was a Christianisation of the goddess; others suggest that she was a real person and that traits of the goddess were transferred to her. Medieval art historian Pamela Berger argues that Christian monks "took the ancient figure of the mother goddess and grafted her name and functions onto her Christian counterpart". Dáithí Ó hÓgáin and others suggest that the saint had been chief druidess at the temple of the goddess Brigid, was responsible for converting it into a Christian monastery, and that the name and characteristics of the goddess later became attached to her.

== Life ==
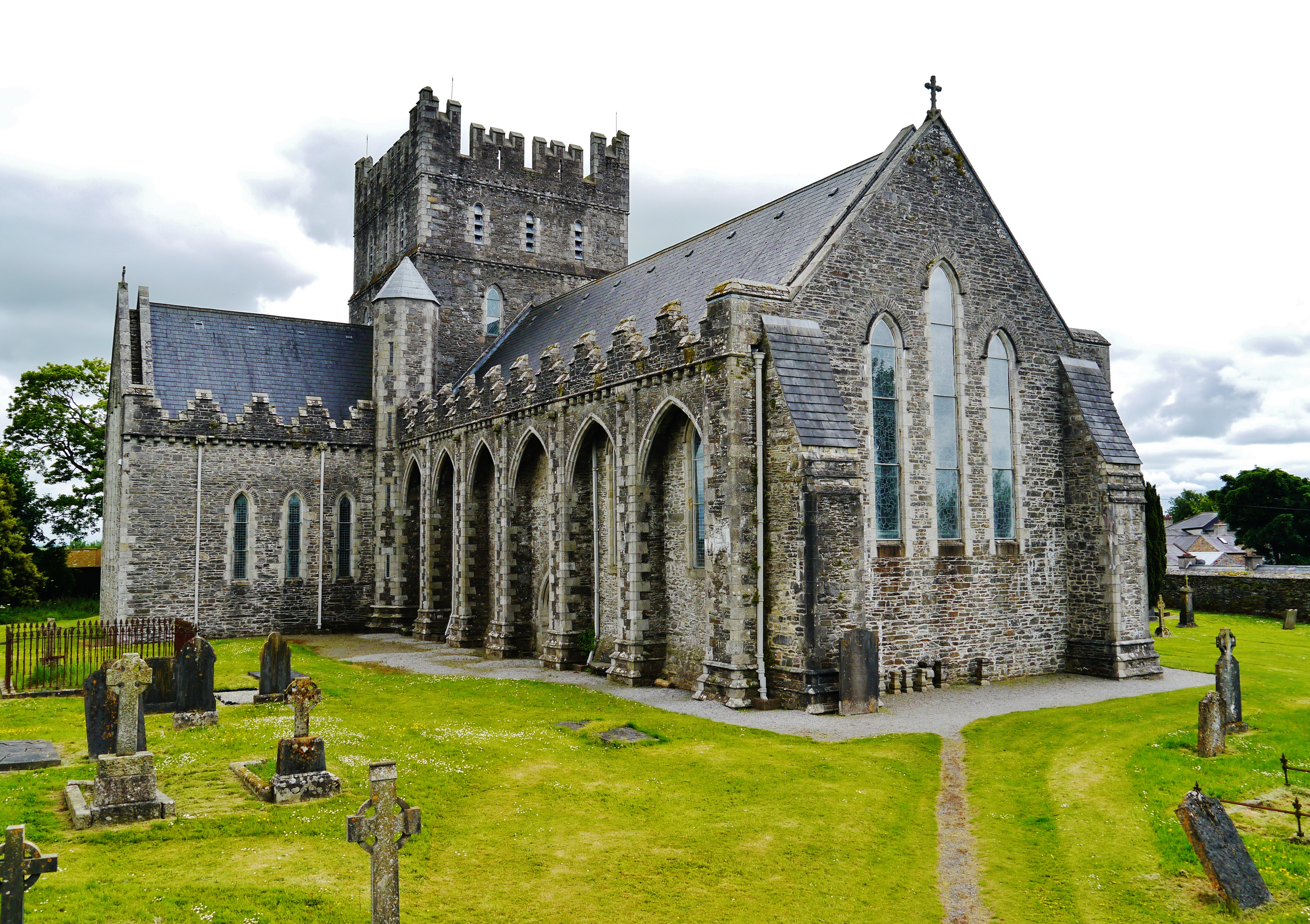
Kildare Cathedral, built on the site of the original abbey said to have been founded by Brigid

=== Sources ===
The earliest accounts of St Brigid are two Old Irish hymns from the 7th century; the first by St Ultan of Ardbraccan (died c. 657), Brigit Bé Bithmaith ('Brigid ever-excellent woman') also known as "Ultan's hymn", and the second is "Broccán's hymn", composed by St Broccán Clóen (died c. 650) at the request of Ultan who was his tutor. "Ultan's hymn" begins:

Brigit bé bithmaith
Breó orda óiblech
donfe don bithlaith
in grian tind toidlech.

Translation:

Brigit, ever good woman
A sparkling golden flame
May she lead us to the eternal realm
The shining bright sun.

Two early Lives of St Brigid in Hiberno-Latin prose, the Vita Sanctae Brigitae I and II, were written in the 7th–8th centuries, the first one possibly by St Aleran (died in 665), lector of Clonard, the second by Cogitosus, a monk of Kildare. A vellum fragment inscribed with her name has been dated to c.700 AD. An Old Irish prose Life, Bethu Brigte, was composed in the 9th century. Several later Latin and Irish Lives of the saint were composed. The Vita III, in hexameter verse, is sometimes attributed to St Coelan of Inishcaltra of the 7th–8th centuries, but appears more likely to have been written by St Donatus, an Irish monk who became Bishop of Fiesole in 824. In Donatus' prologue, it refers to the earlier Lives by Ultan (see before for his hymn), Aleran (see "Vita I") and an Anonymus. A 34-hexameter Latin poem about Saint Brigid had previously been composed by the Irish Roman cleric Colman c. 800.

Discussion on dates for the annals and the accuracy of dates relating to St Brigid continues.

=== Early life ===
Because of the legendary quality of the earliest accounts of her life, there is debate among many secular scholars and Christians as to the truthfulness of her biographies.

Her year of birth is usually given as 451 or 452 AD. One tradition is that Brigid was born at Faughart (just north of Dundalk), in Conaille Muirtheimne, part of the Kingdom of Ulaid. Another tradition is that she was born at Ummeras, near Kildare. All early sources say she was one of the Fothairt, a people mainly based in Leinster. Three biographies name her mother as Broicsech, a slave who had been baptised by Saint Patrick. They name her father as Dubhthach, a chieftain of Leinster.

The Vitae says that Dubhthach's wife forced him to sell Brigid's mother to a druid when she became pregnant. This might have been inspired by the Biblical story of Abraham and Hagar. An 8th-century account calls the druid Maithghean. It says Broicsech gave birth to Brigid at dawn, on the threshold, while bringing milk into the druid's house. This liminality seems to be a vestige of druidic lore. Brigid was thus born into slavery. Legends of her early holiness include her vomiting when the druid tried to feed her, due to his impurity; a white cow with red ears arrives to sustain her instead. Brigid's druid stepfather is portrayed somewhat sympathetically in the stories. He can see that Brigid is special; he is concerned for Brigid's welfare, and he eventually frees her and her mother.

Cogitosus said she spent her youth as a farm worker, churning butter, shepherding the flocks and tending the harvest.

As she grew older, Brigid was said to have worked miracles, including healing and feeding the poor. According to one tale, as a child, she once gave away her mother's entire store of butter. The butter was then replenished in answer to Brigid's prayers. Around the age of ten, she was returned as a household servant to her father, where her charity led her to donate his belongings to the poor.

In both of the earliest biographies, Dubhthach is so annoyed with Brigid that he took her in a chariot to the King of Leinster to sell her. While Dubhthach was talking to the king, Brigid gave away her father's bejewelled sword to a beggar to barter it for food to feed his family. The king recognised her holiness and convinced Dubhthach to grant his daughter freedom.

=== Religious life ===
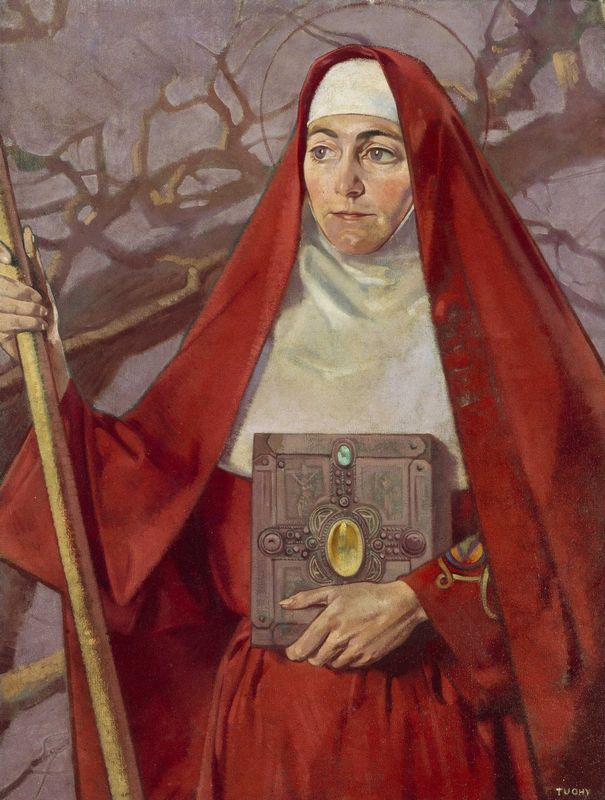
Saint Brigid by Patrick Joseph Tuohy

It is said that Brigid was "veiled" or became a consecrated virgin either through Mac Caille, Bishop of Cruachán Brí Éile, or by St Mél of Ardagh at Mág Tulach (the present barony of Fartullagh, County Westmeath), who gave her the powers of an abbess.

According to tradition, around 480 Brigid founded a monastery at Kildare (Cill Dara, "church of the oak").

Brigid, with an initial group of seven companions, is credited with organising communal consecrated religious life for women in Ireland. She founded two monasteries; one for men, the other for women. Brigid became the first Abbess of Kildare and invited Conleth (Conláed), a hermit from Connell, to help her; he became the first Bishop of Kildare. It has often been said that she gave canonical jurisdiction to Conleth, but Archbishop Healy says that she simply "selected the person to whom the Church gave this jurisdiction", and her biographer says that she chose Conleth "to govern the church along with herself". For centuries, Kildare was ruled by a double line of abbot-bishops and abbess-bishops, the Abbess of Kildare being regarded as superior general of the monasteries in Ireland. Her successors have always been accorded episcopal honour. Brigid's oratory at Kildare became a centre of religion and learning, and developed into a cathedral city.

Brigid is credited with founding a school of art, including metalwork and illumination, which Conleth oversaw. The Kildare scriptorium made the Book of Kildare, which drew high praise from Gerald of Wales (Giraldus Cambrensis), but disappeared during the Reformation. According to Giraldus, nothing that he ever saw was at all comparable to the book, every page of which was gorgeously illuminated, and the interlaced work and the harmony of the colours left the impression that "all this is the work of angelic, and not human skill".

According to the Trias Thaumaturga, Brigid spent time in Connacht and founded many churches in the Diocese of Elphin. She is said to have visited Longford, Tipperary, Limerick, and South Leinster. Her friendship with Patrick is noted in the following paragraph from the Book of Armagh: "inter sanctum Patricium Brigitanque Hibernesium columnas amicitia caritatis inerat tanta, ut unum cor consiliumque haberent unum. Christus per illum illamque virtutes multas peregit" ("Between St. Patrick and St. Brigid, the pillars of the Irish people, there was so great a friendship of charity that they had but one heart and one mind. Through him and through her Christ performed many great works".)

The monk Ultan of Ardbraccan, who wrote the life of Brigid, recounts a story that Darlugdach, Brigid's favourite pupil, fell in love with a young man and, hoping to meet him, snuck out of the bed in which she and Brigid were sleeping. However, recognising her spiritual peril, she prayed for guidance, then placed burning embers in her shoes and put them on. "Thus, by fire", Ultan wrote, "she put out fire, and by pain extinguished pain." She then returned to bed. Brigid feigned sleep but was aware of Darlugdach's departure. The next day, Darlugdach revealed to Brigid the experience of the night before. Brigid reassured her that she was "now safe from the fire of passion and the fire of hell hereafter" and then healed her student's feet. The name Darlugdach (also spelt Dar Lugdach or Dar Lughdacha) means "daughter of the god Lugh".

=== Death ===
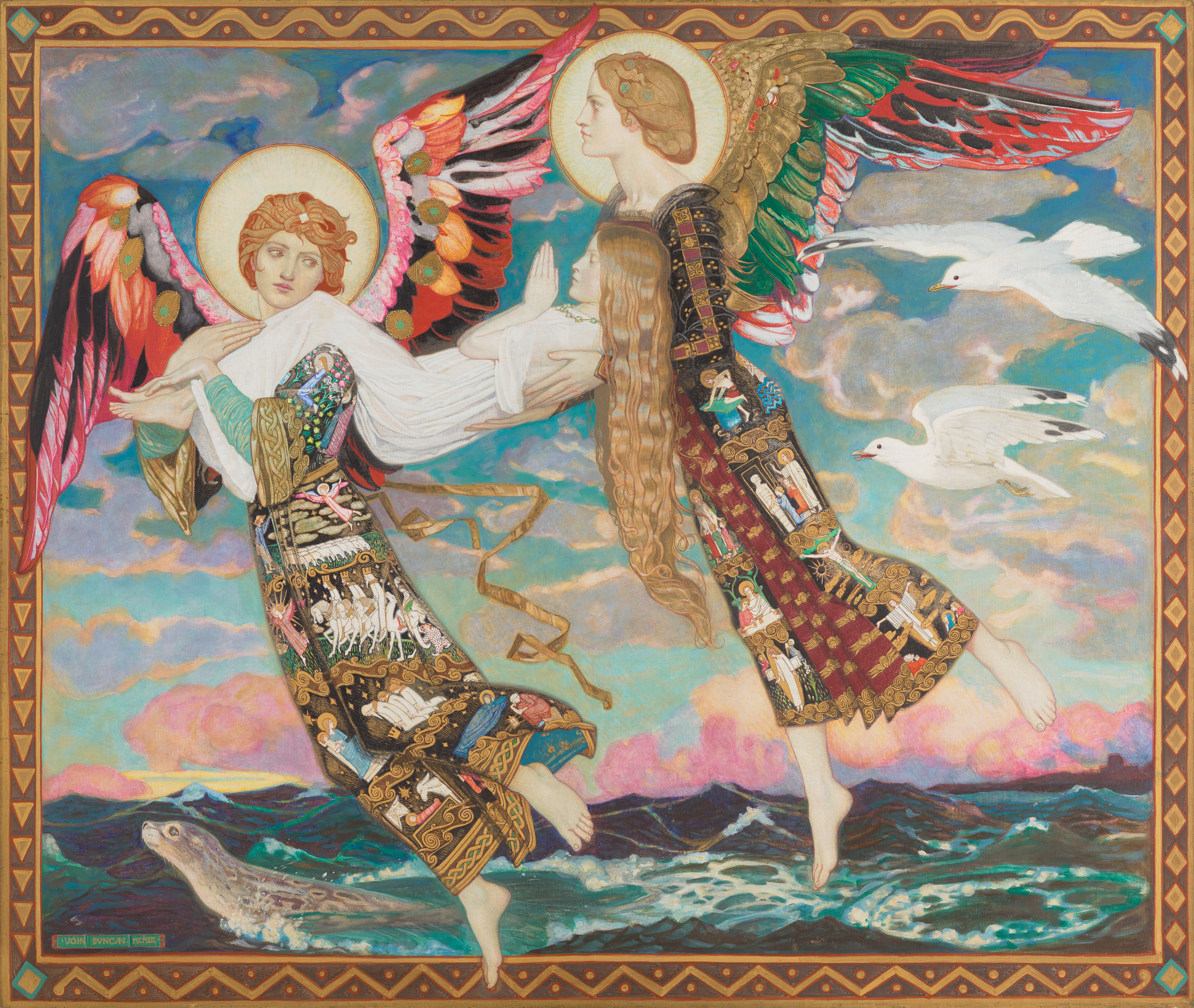
St Brigid being carried away by angels, in a painting by John Duncan (1913)

Brigid is said to have been given the last rites when she was dying by Ninnidh of the Pure Hand. Afterwards, he reportedly had his right hand encased in metal so that it would never be defiled, and this was the origin of his epithet. Tradition says she died at Kildare on 1 February. Her year of death is usually placed around 524 or 525.

Upon Brigid's death, Darlugdach became the second abbess of Kildare. Darlugdach was so devoted to her mentor that when Brigid lay dying, Darlugdach expressed the wish to die with her, but Brigid replied that Darlugdach would die on the first anniversary of her (Brigid's) death. The Catholic Church has assigned 1 February as the feast day of both saints.

== Miracles ==
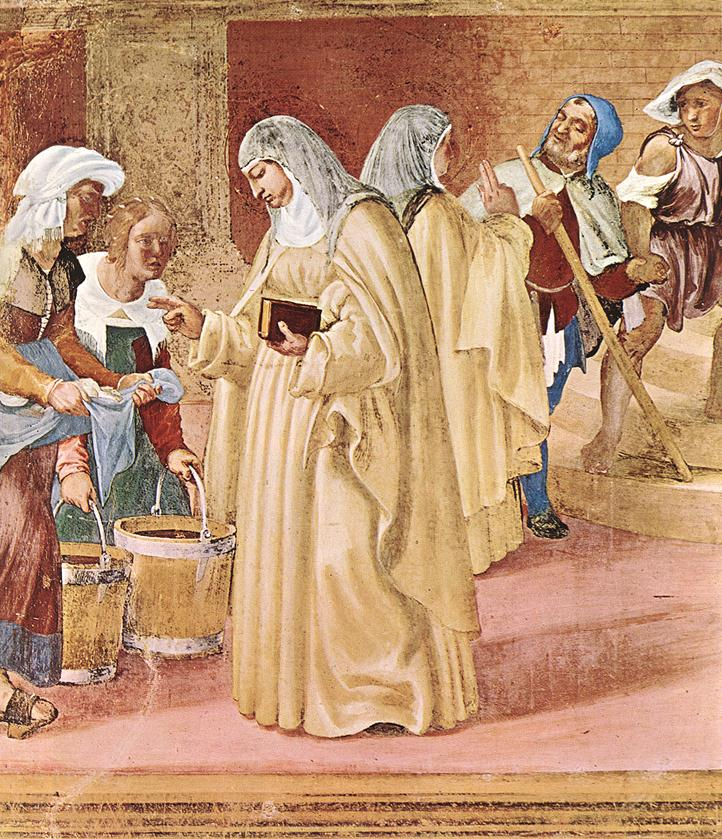
A 16th-century fresco by Lorenzo Lotto in the Suardi Chapel showing Brigid turning water into beer (left) and healing a blind man (right)

Thomas Charles-Edwards wrote that Brigid's power is expressed in 'helping' miracles: healing, feeding the hungry, and rescuing the weak from violence. Unlike Saint Patrick, "most of her miracles were humble affairs for people of low rank" and she "never dictates the course of dynastic politics".

Dáithí Ó hÓgáin wrote that the melding of a pagan goddess and a Christian saint can be seen in some of the miracles, where Brigid multiplies food, bestows cattle and sheep, controls the weather, and is associated with fire or thermal springs.

According to Brian Wright, the miracles of Brigid outlined by Cogitosus mostly concern healing; charity; cows, sheep and dairy; the harvest; fire; fertility/pregnancy; and her virginity/holiness.

- One of the most well-known stories is of Brigid asking the King of Leinster for land. She told the king that the place where she stood was the perfect spot for a convent. It was beside a forest where they could gather firewood and berries, there was a lake nearby that would provide water, and the land was fertile. The king laughed at her and refused to give her any land. Brigid prayed and asked God to soften the king's heart. Then she smiled at the king and said, "Will you give me as much land as my cloak will cover?" The king thought that she was joking and agreed. She told four of her sisters to take up the cloak, but instead of laying it flat on the turf, each sister, with face turned to a different point of the compass, began to run swiftly. The cloak grew in all directions and covered many acres of land. "Oh, Brigid!" said the frightened king, "what are you about?". "I am, or rather my cloak is about covering your whole province to punish you for your stinginess to the poor". "Call your maidens back. I will give you a decent plot of ground." The saint was persuaded, and if the king held his purse-strings tight in the future, she had only to allude to her cloak to bring him to reason. Soon afterward, the king became a Christian, began to help the poor, and commissioned the building of the convent. This story was probably inspired by that of Dido.
- After Brigid promised God a life of chastity, her brothers were annoyed at the loss of a bride price. When she was outside carrying a load past a group of poor people, some began to laugh at her. A man named Bacene said to her, "The beautiful eye which is in your head will be betrothed to a man though you like it or not". In response, Brigid thrust her finger in her eye and said, "Here is that beautiful eye for you. I deem it unlikely that anyone will ask you for a blind girl". Her brothers tried to save her and wash away the blood from her wound, but there was no water to be found. Brigid said to them, "Put my staff about this sod in front of you", and after they did, a stream came forth from the ground. Then she said to Bacene, "Soon your two eyes will burst in your head", and it happened as she said. This story was probably inspired by the lore of Saint Lucy.
- When Brigid was of marital age, a man by the name of Dubthach maccu Lugair came to woo her. Since Brigid had offered her virginity to God, she told the man that she could not accept him but that he should go to the woods behind his house where he would find a beautiful maiden to marry. Everything that he said to the maiden's parents would be pleasing to them. The man followed her instructions and Brigid's prophecy came true.

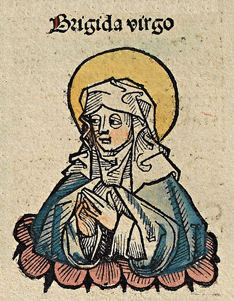
Saint Brigid depicted in the Nuremberg Chronicle

- Brigid, who was an expert dairywoman and brewer, was reputed to turn water into beer.
- The prayers of Saint Brigid were said to still the wind and the rain.
- In one story, Brigid protected a woman from a nobleman who had entrusted a silver brooch to the woman for safekeeping but then secretly had thrown it into the sea. He charged her with stealing it, knowing that he could take her as a slave if a judge ruled in his favour. The woman fled and sought refuge with Brigid's community. By chance, one of her fishermen caught a fish which, when cut open, was found to have swallowed the brooch. The nobleman freed the woman, confessed his sin, and bowed in submission to Brigid. This is also an Irish version of a widespread story; another version is told of Saint Mungo/Kentigern.
- When Brigid was travelling to see a doctor for a headache, she stayed at the house of a Leinster couple who had two mute daughters. The daughters were travelling with Brigid when her horse startled, causing her to fall and graze her head on a stone. A touch of Brigid's blood healed the girls of their muteness.
- Brigid is said to have preserved a nun's chastity in unusual circumstances. Liam de Paor (1993) and Connolly & Picard (1987), in their complete translations of Cogitosus, give substantially the same translation of the account of Brigid's ministry to a nun who had failed to keep her vow of chastity and had become pregnant. In the 1987 translation: "A certain woman who had taken the vow of chastity fell, through the youthful desire of pleasure, and her womb swelled with child. Brigid, exercising the most potent strength of her ineffable faith, blessed her, causing the child to disappear, without coming to birth, and without pain. She faithfully returned the woman to health and to penance". The Brigid Alliance, an American NGO that assists people seeking abortions, was named after St Brigid in reference to this miracle. The purported miracle has never been approved by the Vatican as having actually occurred, and the historicity of Cogitosus' account has been called into question.
- When on the bank of the River Inny, Brigid was given a gift of apples and sweet sloes. She later entered a house where many lepers begged her for these apples, which she offered willingly. The woman who had given the gift to Brigid was angered by this, saying that she had not given the gift to the lepers. Brigid was angry at the woman for withholding from the lepers and cursed her trees so they would no longer bear fruit. Another woman gave Brigid the same gift, and again Brigid gave them to begging lepers. This woman asked that she and her garden be blessed. Brigid said that a large tree in the garden would have twofold fruit from its offshoots, and this came true.

== Veneration ==
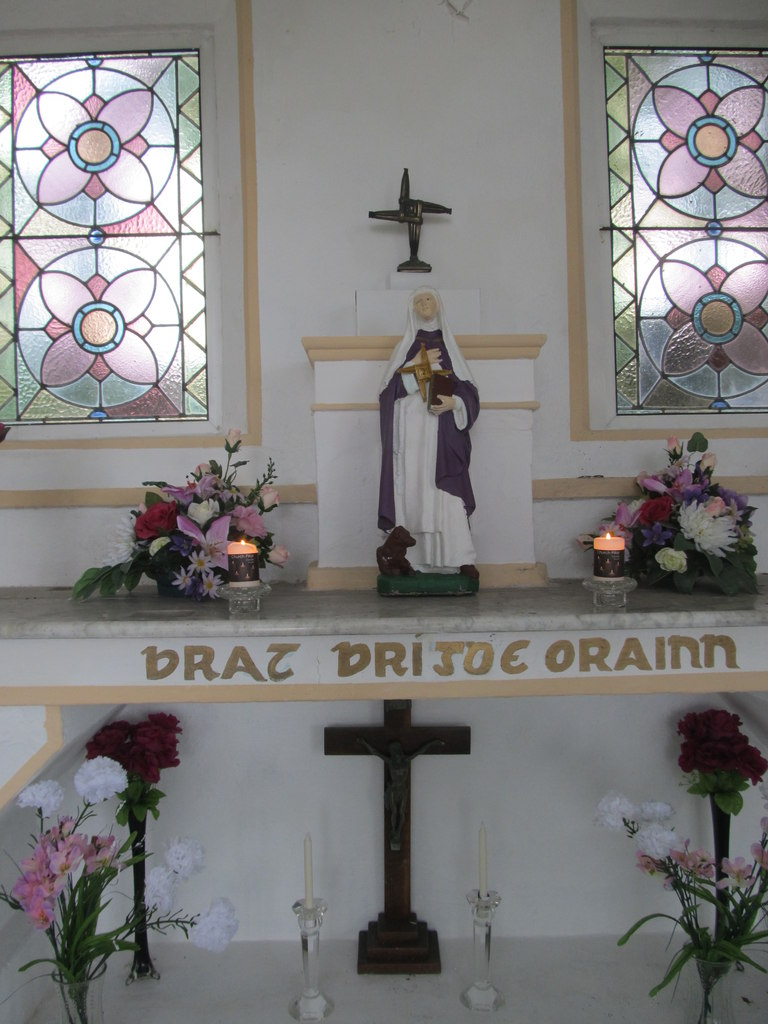
St Brigid's shrine at Faughart

Brigid is honoured on 1 February in the calendars of the Catholic Church in Ireland, as well as the Anglican Church of Ireland, Church of England, and Episcopal Church.

She is a patroness saint of Ireland (and one of its three national saints), as well as of healers, poets, blacksmiths, livestock and dairy workers, among others.

Brigid is said to have been buried at the high altar of the original Kildare Cathedral, and a tomb raised over her "adorned with gems and precious stones and crowns of gold and silver".

In the late 12th century, Gerald of Wales wrote that nineteen nuns took turns keeping a perpetual fire burning at Kildare in honour of Brigid, and that this fire had been burning since Brigid's time. He said it was ringed by a hedge that no man was allowed to cross. According to Gerald, each of the nineteen nuns took their turns guarding the fire overnight, but every twentieth night Brigid was said to return to keep the fire burning: "the nineteenth nun puts the logs beside the fire and says 'Brigid, guard your fire, this is your night'. And in this way the fire is left there, and in the morning the wood, as usual, has been burnt and the fire is still alight". It has been suggested that this perpetual fire was originally part of a temple of Brigit the goddess.

=== Saint Brigid's Day ===
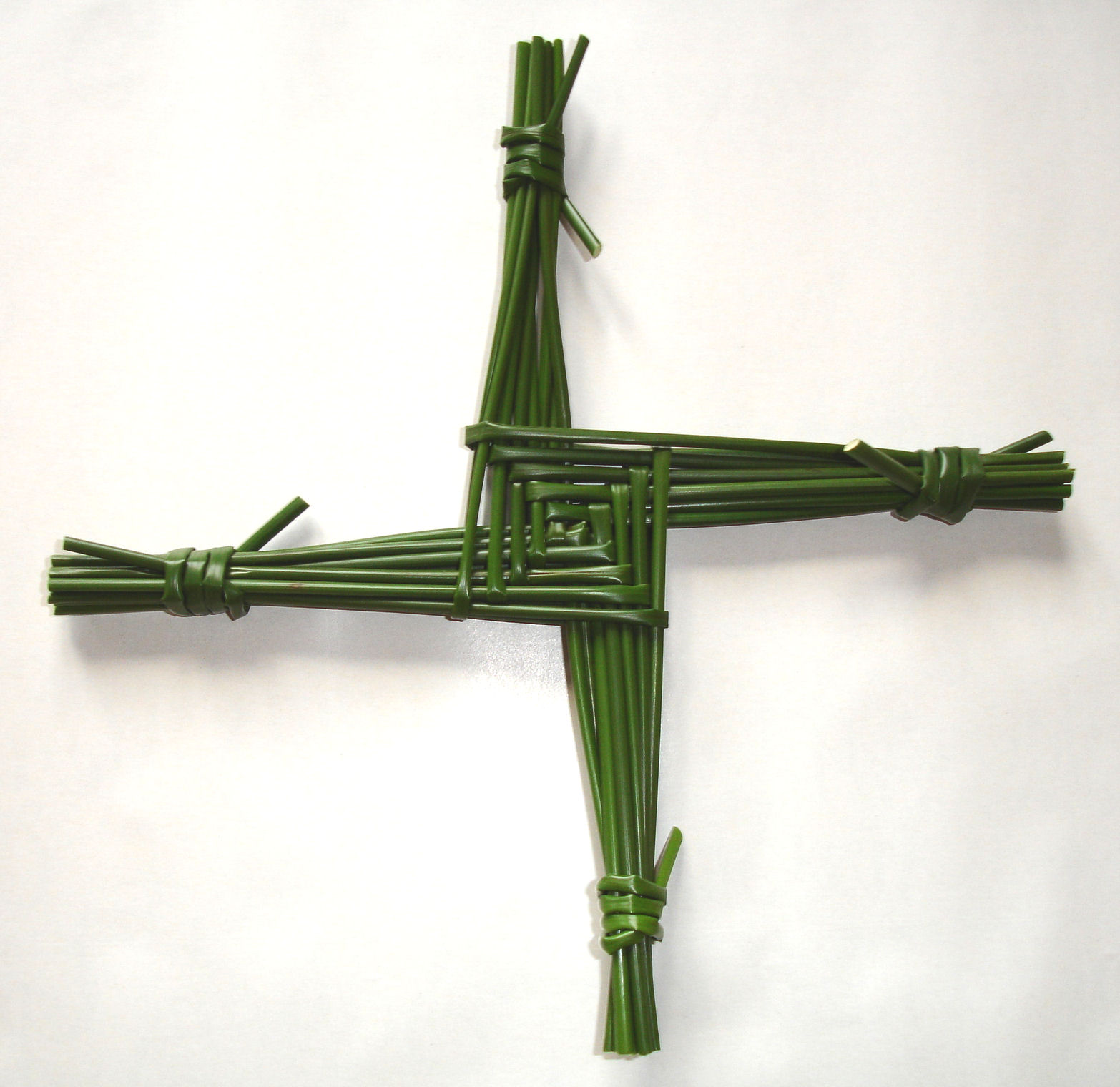
Saint Brigid's Cross or Crosóg Bhríde

Saint Brigid's feast day is 1 February. Cogitosus, writing in the late 7th century, is the first to mention a feast day of Saint Brigid being observed in Kildare on this date. It was also the date of Imbolc, a seasonal festival that is believed to have pre-Christian origins. Imbolc is one of four Gaelic seasonal festivals, along with Bealtaine (1 May), Lughnasa (1 August), and Samhain (1 November).

The customs of Saint Brigid's Day did not begin to be recorded in detail until the early modern era. Brigid's crosses are traditionally made on her feast day. These are three- or four-armed crosses woven from rushes. They are hung over doors and windows for protection against fire, lightning, illness and evil spirits.

On St Brigid's Eve, Brigid was said to visit virtuous households and bless the inhabitants. People left items of clothing or strips of cloth outside overnight for Brigid to bless. These were believed to have powers of healing and protection. Brigid would be symbolically invited into the home and a bed would often be made for her. In some places, a family member who represented Brigid would circle the house three times carrying rushes. They would then knock on the door three times before being welcomed in.

In Ireland and parts of Scotland, a doll representing Brigid would be paraded around the community by girls and young women. Known as the Brídeóg ('little Brigid'), anglicized 'Breedhoge' or 'Biddy', it was made from rushes or reeds and clad in bits of cloth, flowers, or shells. In some areas, a girl took on the role of Brigid. Escorted by other girls, she went house-to-house wearing 'Brigid's crown' and carrying 'Brigid's shield' and 'Brigid's cross', all of which were made from rushes.

St Brigid's Day parades have been revived in the town of Killorglin, County Kerry, which holds a yearly "Biddy's Day Festival". Men and women wearing elaborate straw hats and masks visit public houses carrying a Brídeóg to ward off evil spirits and bring good luck for the coming year.

==== Holy wells ====
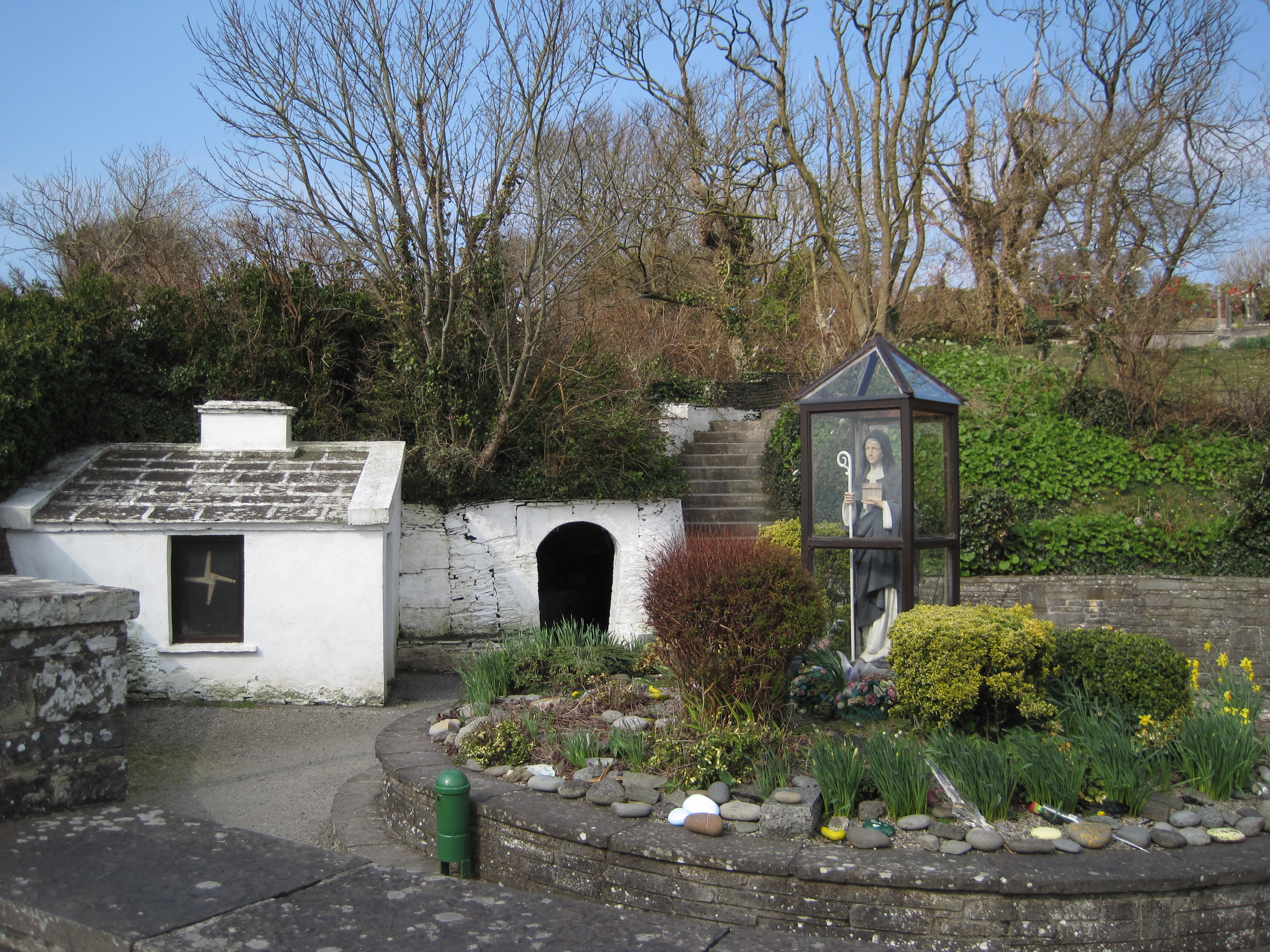
St Brigid's Well in Liscannor

Holy wells are often visited on St Brigid's Day, especially those wells dedicated to her. St Brigid, along with St Patrick, is the saint assigned to holy wells when their patron is unknown, and along with St Patrick and St Mary is one of the saints with the most holy wells dedicated to her.

Holy wells are sites of pilgrimage for some Irish Catholics, who come to give thanks or pray to the wells' patron saints. Visitors sometimes leave tokens, such as religious medals or prayer cards, and some take holy well water with them. Most holy wells are said to be able to cure various conditions and diseases, with some exceptions such as St Brigid's Well in Brideswell, which is said to aid with fertility.

One form of prayer at holy wells is known as "the rounds," and consists of prayers recited while circling the well a prescribed number of times. St Brigid’s Well in Liscannor has a rosary-shaped path for visitors to walk as they pray, and prayers involve "ascending steps to a carved sandstone cross which must be circled, touched, and kissed five times before descending the pathway back to the well shrine, where sacred waters are collected and anointed in the sign of the cross upon one’s head and torso."

=== Relics ===
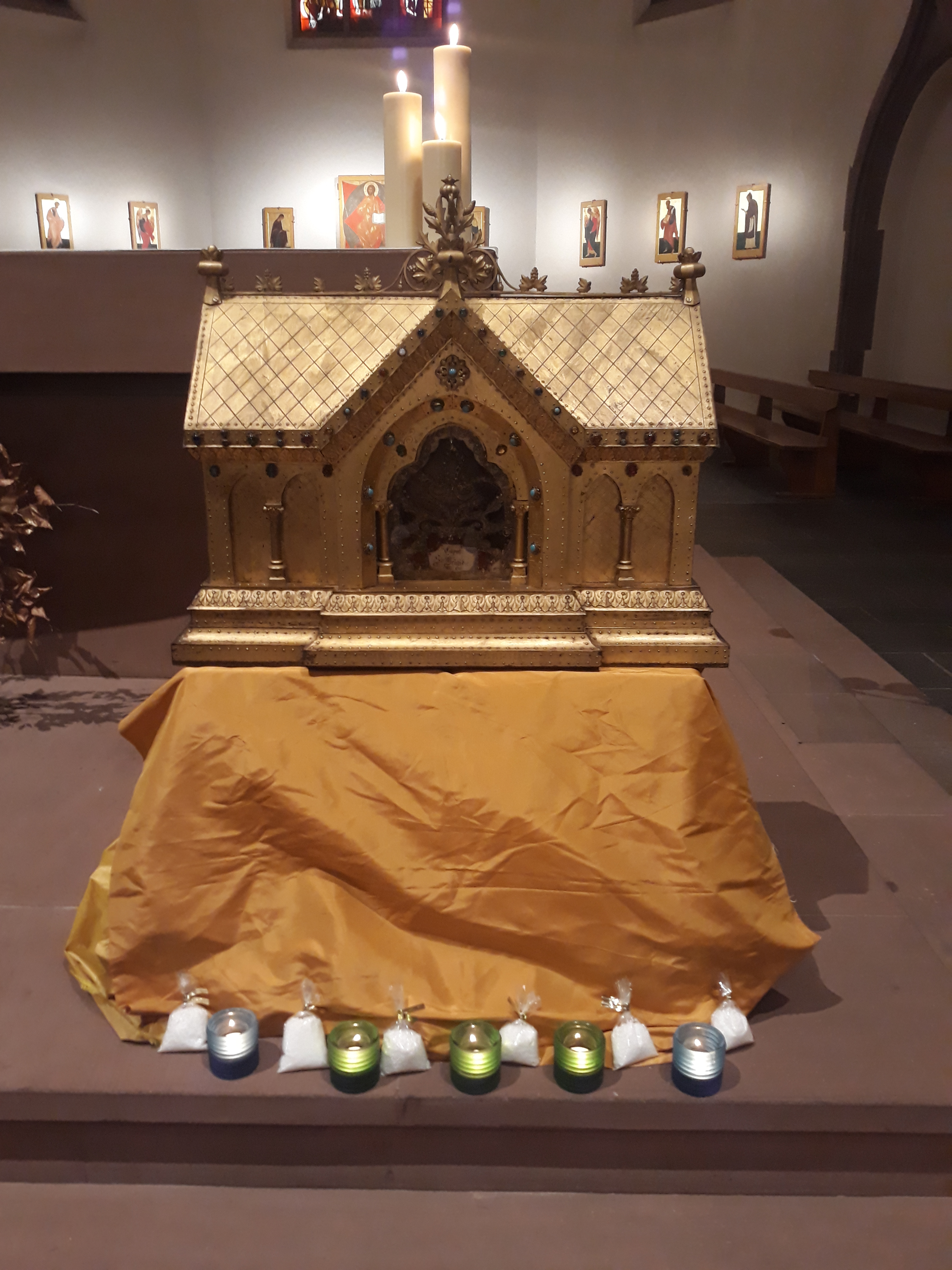
A reliquary of Saint Brigid in Old Saint Peter's Church, Strasbourg

About the year 878, owing to Viking raids, Brigid's relics were purportedly taken to Downpatrick and reburied in the tomb of St Patrick and St Columba. The relics of the three saints were said to have been found in 1185 by John de Courcy, and on 9 June of the following year he had them solemnly reburied in Down Cathedral. They are said to have remained in Down Cathedral until 1538, when the relics were desecrated and destroyed during the deputyship of Lord Grey, excepting Brigid's head which was saved by some of the clergymen who took it to the Franciscan monastery of Neustadt, in Austria. In 1587 it was presented to the church of the Society of Jesus in Lisbon by Emperor Rudolph II, that is the Igreja de São Roque (Church of St Roch), where a frontal part of her skull is still venerated. However, an occipital part of the skull could already have reached Portugal in the 13th century, preserved in the Igreja São João Batista (Church of St. John the Baptist), on the Lumiar (near Lisbon Airport), where it is venerated on 2 February (not 1 February, as in Ireland). According to the local tradition of the latter church, St. Brigid's head would have been carried to King Dinis of Portugal in 1283 by three Irish knights travelling to the Aragonese Crusade. A commemorative inscription on the northern façade of the church, in 16th-century characters, reads: "Here in these three tombs lie the three Irish knights who brought the head of St. Brigid, Virgin, a native of Ireland, whose relic is preserved in this chapel. In memory of which, the officials of the Altar of the same Saint caused this to be done in January AD 1283." It is in fact only from the mid-16th century onwards that this church assumed the invocation of Saint Brígida when a new side chapel was built and dedicated to her.

In 1884, Francis Cardinal Moran, Archbishop of Sydney, obtained a relic of the saint's tooth from the parochial church of St. Martin of Tours in Cologne in the German Empire and gave it to the Brigidine Sisters in Melbourne. Cardinal Moran wrote about the circumstances in which he obtained the tooth in a letter to the Reverend Mother of this Convent dated 13 March 1906:

I went all the way to Cologne on my return from Rome in 1884, on my appointment of Archbishop of Sydney to secure a portion of the precious relic of St. Brigid preserved there for over a thousand years. It is venerated at present in the Parochial Church of St. Martin to which in olden times was attached a famous Irish monastery….. The relic is, if I remember aright, a tooth of the Saint. At Cologne, I found great difficulty in securing a portion of this relic. It was at first peremptorily refused. The Pastor of St. Martin's declared that his parishioners would be at once in revolt if they heard that their great parochial treasure was being interfered with. I then had to invoke the aid of an influential Canon of the Cathedral of Cologne, whom I had assisted in some of his literary pursuits and he set his heart on procuring the coveted relic. One of his arguments was somewhat amusing: It was the first time that an Irish Archbishop of the remote See of Sydney had solicited a favour from Cologne. It was the new Christian world appealing to the old for a share of its sacred wealth. At all events our pleading was successful and, and I bore away with me a portion of the bone, duly authenticated, which is now the privilege of you good Sisters to guard and venerate….

In 1905, Sister Mary Agnes of the Dundalk Convent of Mercy took a purported fragment of the skull to St. Bridget's [sic] Church in Kilcurry. In 1928, Fathers Timothy Traynor and James McCarroll requested another fragment for St. Brigid's Church in Killester, a request granted by the Bishop of Lisbon, António Mendes Belo.

The city of Armagh had several associations with St. Brigid. In the twelfth century, the city had two crosses dedicated to Brigid, though, according to the Monasticon Hibernicum, purported relics of the saint reposing in Armagh were lost in an accidental fire in 1179. In the seventeenth century, Armagh also had a street named Brigid located near Brigid's church in the area called "Brigid's Ward."

The Old Saint Peter's Church, Strasbourg contains also (unspecified) relics of St. Brigid, brought by the canons of St. Michael in 1398 when they were forced to leave their submerged abbey of Honau-Rheinau, itself founded by Irish monks.

=== Iconography ===
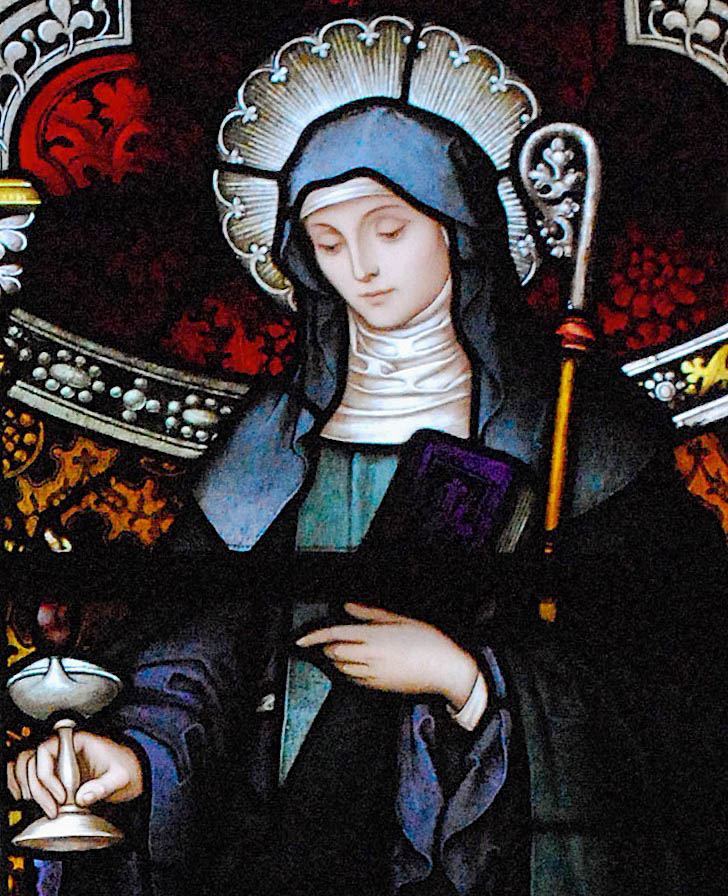
Saint Brigid depicted on stained glass holding symbols of her iconography

In liturgical iconography and statuary, Saint Brigid is often depicted holding a Cross of Saint Brigid, a crozier of the sort used by abbots, and a lamp. Early hagiographers portray Brigid's life and ministry as touched with fire. According to Patrick Weston Joyce, tradition holds that nuns at her monastery kept an eternal flame burning there. She is also often depicted with a cow, or sometimes geese. Leitmotifs, some of them borrowed from the apocrypha such as the story where she hangs her cloak on a sunbeam, are associated with the wonder tales of her hagiography and folklore. Cogitosus' circa 650 Vita Sanctae Brigidae portrays Brigid as having the power to multiply such things as butter, bacon, and milk, to bestow sheep and cattle, and to control the weather.

Plant motifs associated with St. Brigid include the white Lilium candidum popularly known since medieval times as the Madonna Lily for its association with the Virgin Mary, and the Windflower Anemone coronaria, called the "Brigid anemone" since the early 19th century. Heleborus niger augustifolius is also known as the "St. Brigid's Christmas Rose". Kildare, the church of the oak Quercus petraea, is associated with a tree sacred to the druids.

=== Placenames ===
==== Ireland ====
Kilbride ("Church of Brigid") is one of Ireland's most widely found placenames, there are 45 Kilbrides located in 19 of Ireland's 32 counties: Antrim (2), Carlow, Cavan, Down, Dublin, Galway, Kildare, Kilkenny (3), Laois, Longford, Louth, Mayo (5), Meath (4), Offaly (4), Roscommon (2), Waterford, Westmeath (2), Wexford (4), and Wicklow (8) as well as two Kilbreedys in Tipperary, Kilbreedia and Toberbreeda in Clare, Toberbreedia in Kilkenny, Brideswell Commons in Dublin, Bridestown and Templebreedy in Cork and Rathbride and Brideschurch in Kildare. A number of placenames are derived from Cnoic Bhríde ("Brigid's Hill"), such as Knockbridge in Louth and Knockbride in Cavan.

==== Wales ====
There are many traditions associating the saint with Wales, with dedications and folklore found across the country. As such, villages are often named for either a church or "Llan" associated with Bridget. These include the village, castle and parish of St Brides in Pembrokeshire (near St Brides Bay), the churches and villages of St. Brides-super-Ely and St Brides Major in the Vale of Glamorgan, the church and village of St. Brides Netherwent in Monmouthshire and the church of St Brides, in Newport, the village of Llansanffraid Glan Conwy in Conwy, Llansantffraid in Ceredigion, and the villages of Llansantffraid-ym-Mechain and Llansantffraed in Powys.

==== Scotland ====
In Scotland, East Kilbride and West Kilbride are called after Brigid. Lhanbryde, near Elgin, Scotland is thought to be Pictish for "Church of Brigid". In Toryglen, on Glasgow's southside, there is St. Brigid's RC parish.

In Hebridean mythology and folklore, one of the most prominent figures featured in ethnomusicologist Margaret Fay Shaw's iconic 1955 book Folksongs and Folklore of South Uist is St Brigid of Kildare, about whom many local stories, songs, and customs are recorded.

==== England ====
In Fleet Street, City of London stands St Bride's Church, substantially rebuilt since its foundation in the 600s (7th century).

==== Isle of Man ====
In the Isle of Man, where the first name "Breeshey", the Manx form of the name is common, the parish of Bride is named after the saint.

==== Elsewhere ====
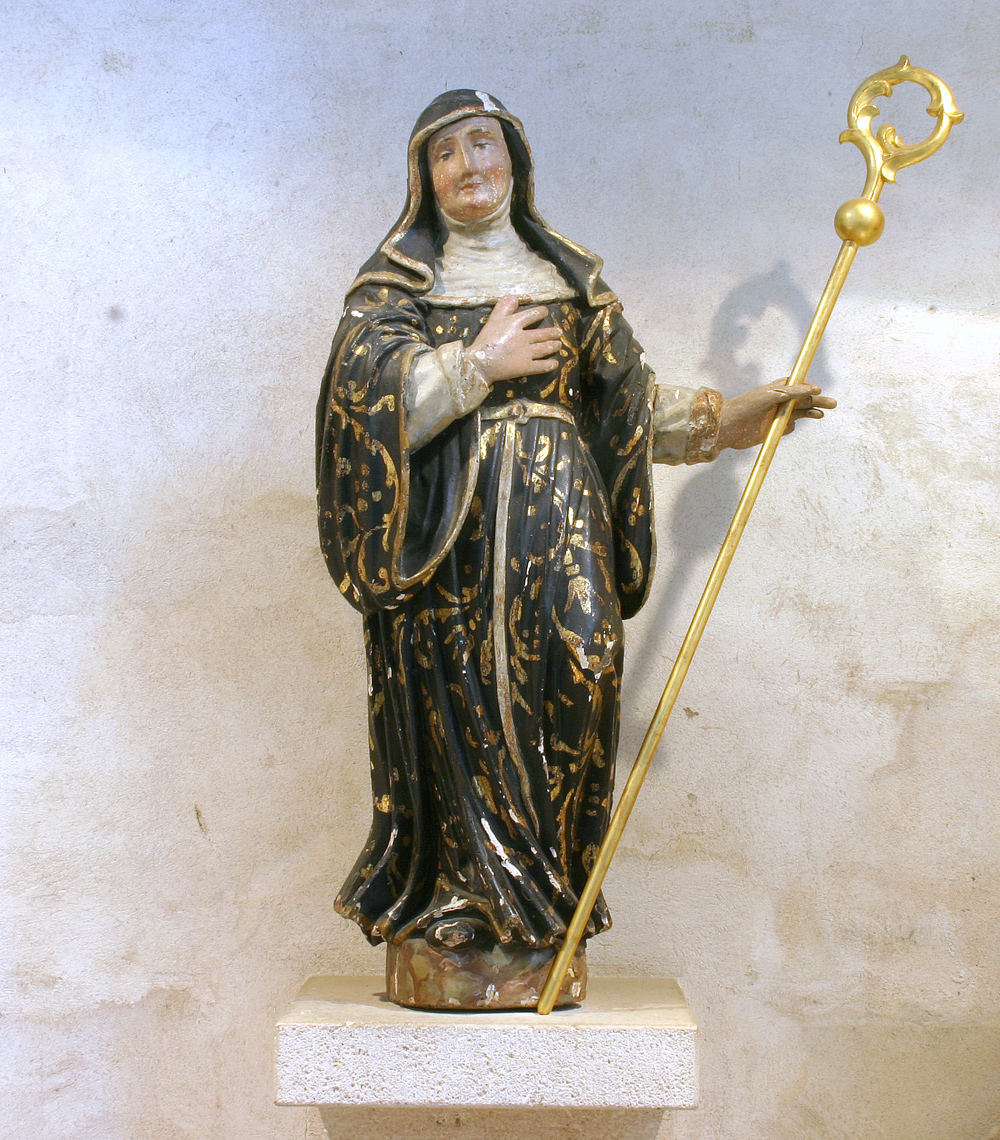
Brigida von Kildare, Gross St. Martin, Köln

- In the United States, in Marshall County, Kansas, is the unincorporated community (or township) St. Bridget, described by some accounts as an extinct town.
- St. Bride's, Newfoundland and Labrador, at the southwest tip of the Avalon Peninsula, is named for St. Brigid, reflecting historical ties to southeastern Ireland
- St. Brigid Island in Antarctica is named after Brigid of Kildare.
- Bierstadt, Germany, a borough of Wiesbaden, was originally named Birgidstadt, after the saint's name in German, Brigida von Kildare.
- In Argentina there are many locations that pay homage to Santa Brigida. Also, one of the biggest schools in Buenos Aires is the St. Brigid School next to Ireland Square in the Caballito Neighborhood, one of the popular destinations for Irish immigrants to the country.

=== Other ===
St. Brigid's popularity made the name Brigid (and variants, e.g., Brigitte, Bridie, and Bree) popular in Ireland over the centuries. One writer noted that at one time in history "every Irish family had a Patrick and a Brigid".

In Haitian Vodou, Saint Brigid (along with the goddess Brigid and Mary Magdalene) is worshipped as the death loa Maman Brigitte, the consort of Baron Samedi.

=== Links with Glastonbury ===
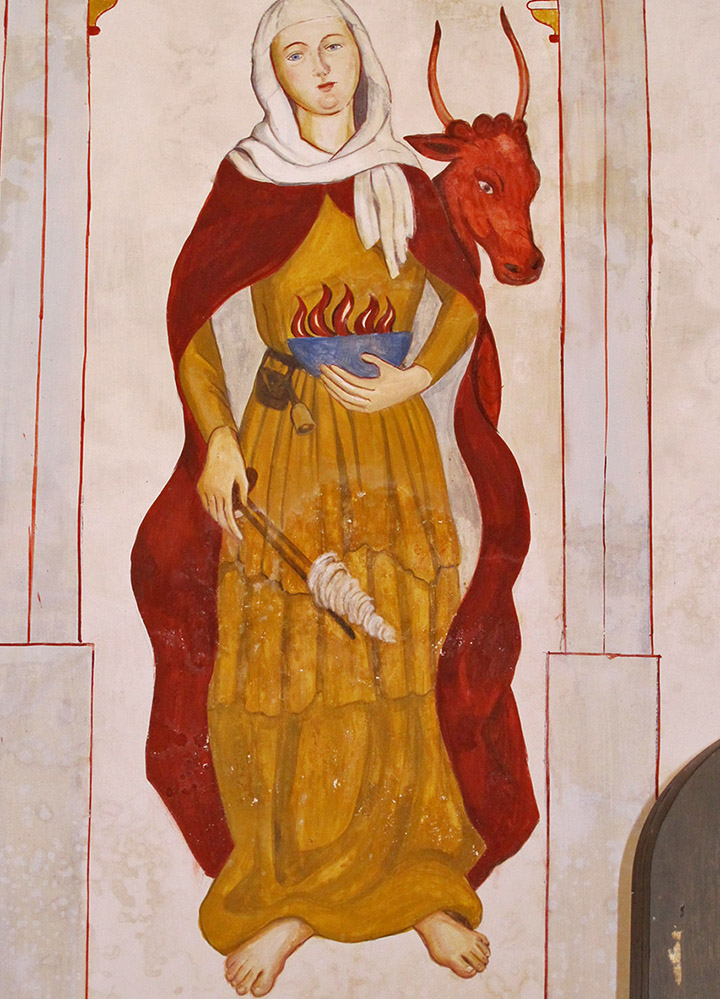
A painting of Saint Brigid in St. Patrick's Chapel, Glastonbury

St. Brigid has long been linked to Glastonbury. Sites that depict her include Glastonbury Tor, where a stone carving of her milking a cow can be seen above one side of the entrance. She also appears in a fresco painting that adorns the interior of St. Patrick's Chapel on the grounds of Glastonbury Abbey depicting the saint with a spindle, a bowl of fire, and a cow in the background.

It is also documented by William of Malmesbury that ‘Wherefore the report is extremely prevalent that both Saint Indract and Saint Brigid, no mean inhabitants of Ireland, formerly came over to this spot. Whether Brigid returned home or died at Glastonbury is not sufficiently ascertained, though she left here some of her ornaments; that is to say, her necklace, bag, and implements for embroidering, which are yet shown in memory of her sanctity, and are efficacious in curing divers diseases.’

The Benedictine Monk John of Glastonbury wrote in the mid-fourteenth century that the chapel which was excavated in Beckery was named after her; 'Saint Brigid made a stay of several years on an island near Glastonbury, called Bekery or Little Ireland, where there was an oratory consecrated in honour of Saint Mary Magdalene. She left there certain signs of her presence—her wallet, collar, bell, and weaving implements, which are exhibited and honoured there because of her holy memory—and she returned to Ireland, where, not much later, she rested in the Lord and was buried in the city of Down. The chapel on that island is now dedicated in honour of Saint Brigid; on its south side there is an opening through which, according to the belief of the common folk, anyone who passes will receive forgiveness of all his sins.’

Brides Mound in Beckery is also linked to St. Bridgid and in 2004 'Brigadine sisters, Mary and Rita Minehan, brought the perpetual Brigid flame (restored in 1993) from Solas Bhrde, in Kildare, during a Glastonbury Goddess Conference ceremony on Bride's Mound.'

== In popular culture ==
A fictionalised wish-granting version of Saint Brigid appears in the 2024 Netflix fantasy romantic comedy film Irish Wish.

The poet Catherine Ann Cullen has written a song "Brigid's Cloak".

== In the Twentieth Century Irish Stained Glass Revival ==
The An Túr Gloine (Tower of Glass) stained glass studio drew inspiration from Medieval art to create a counterpoint to mass produced Victorian religious imagery. Founded in Dublin, it lasted from 1903-44. St. Brigid of Kildare served as a muse to many artists there.

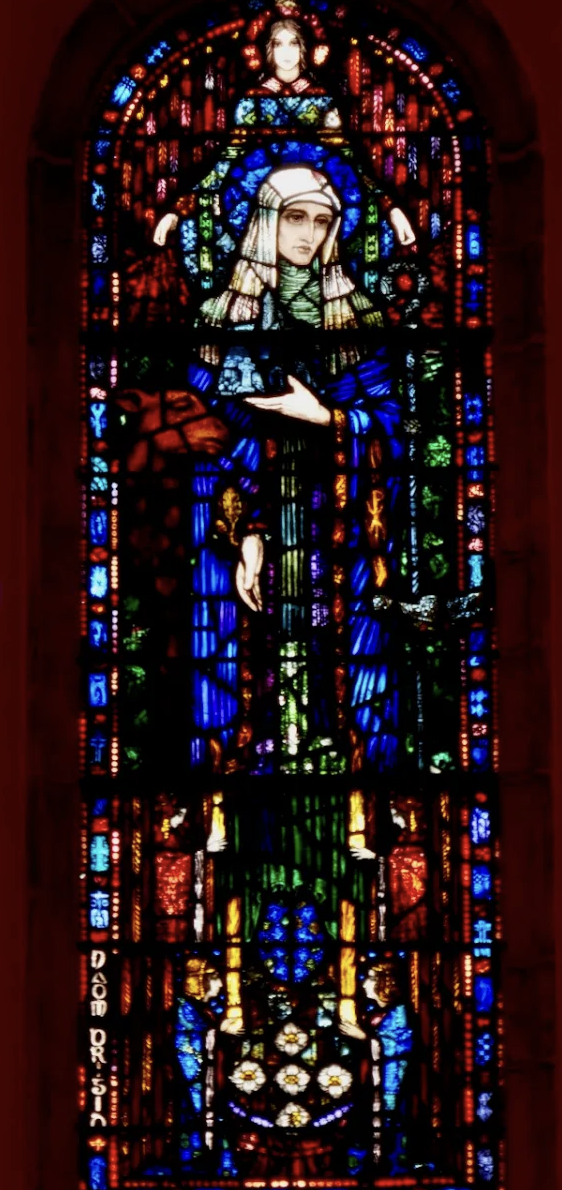
Harry Clarke, St. Brigid (1915)

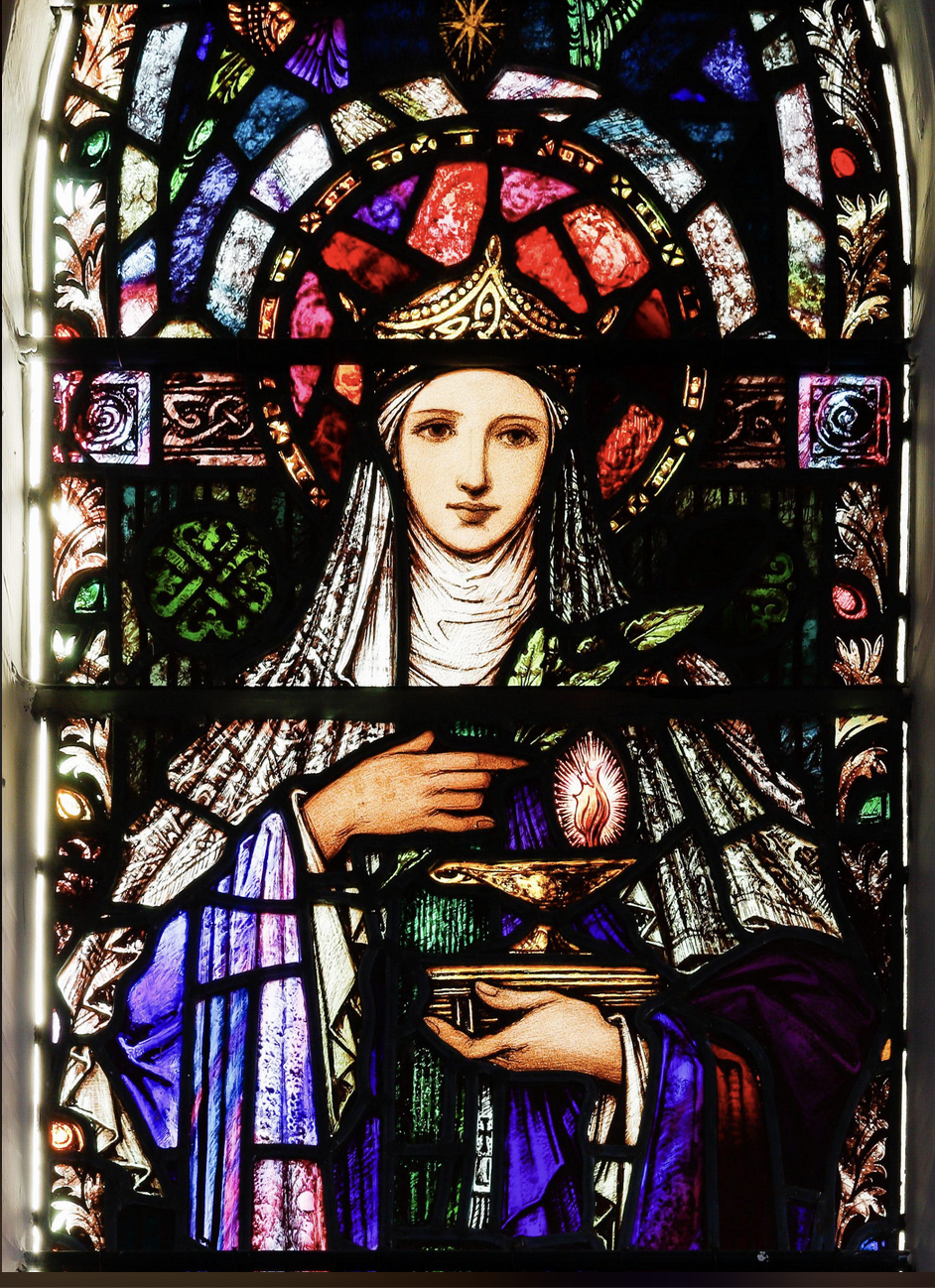
Michael Healy stained glass window (1916), detail St. Brigid

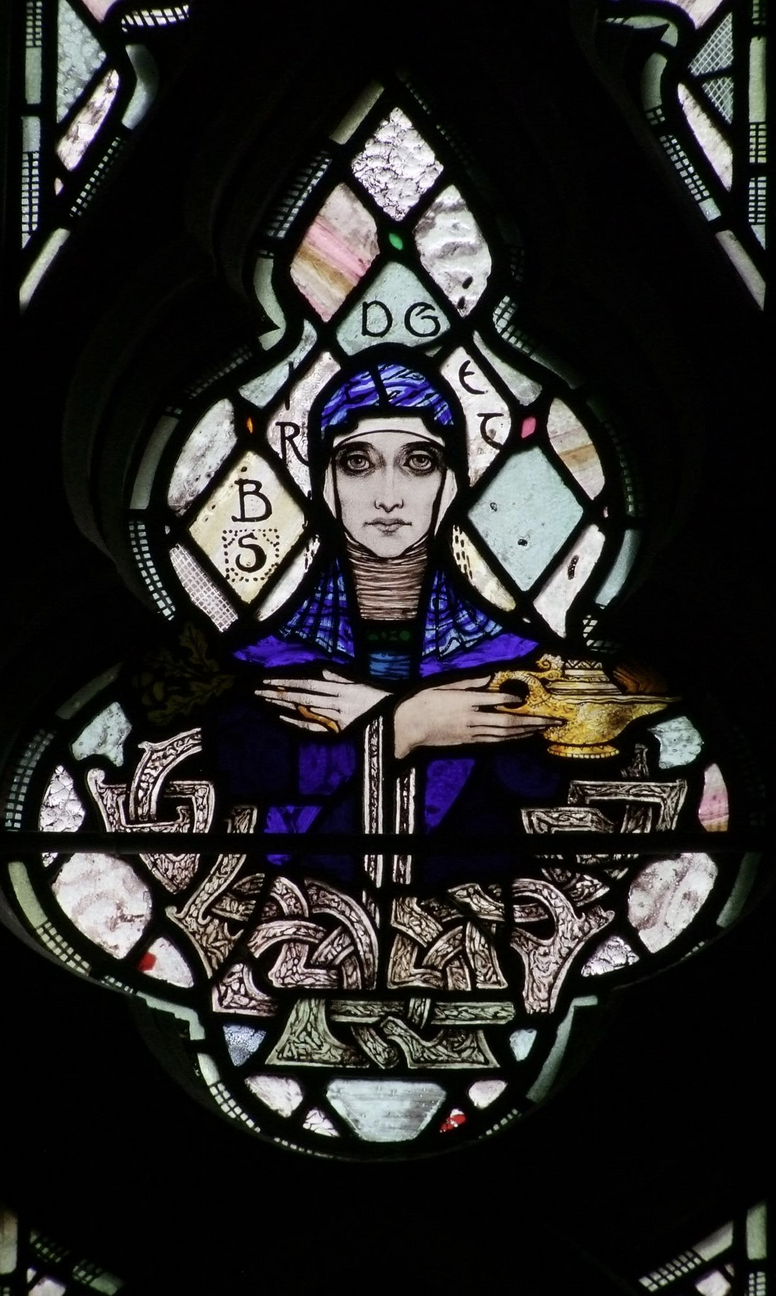
Harry Clarke, St. Brigid (1918)

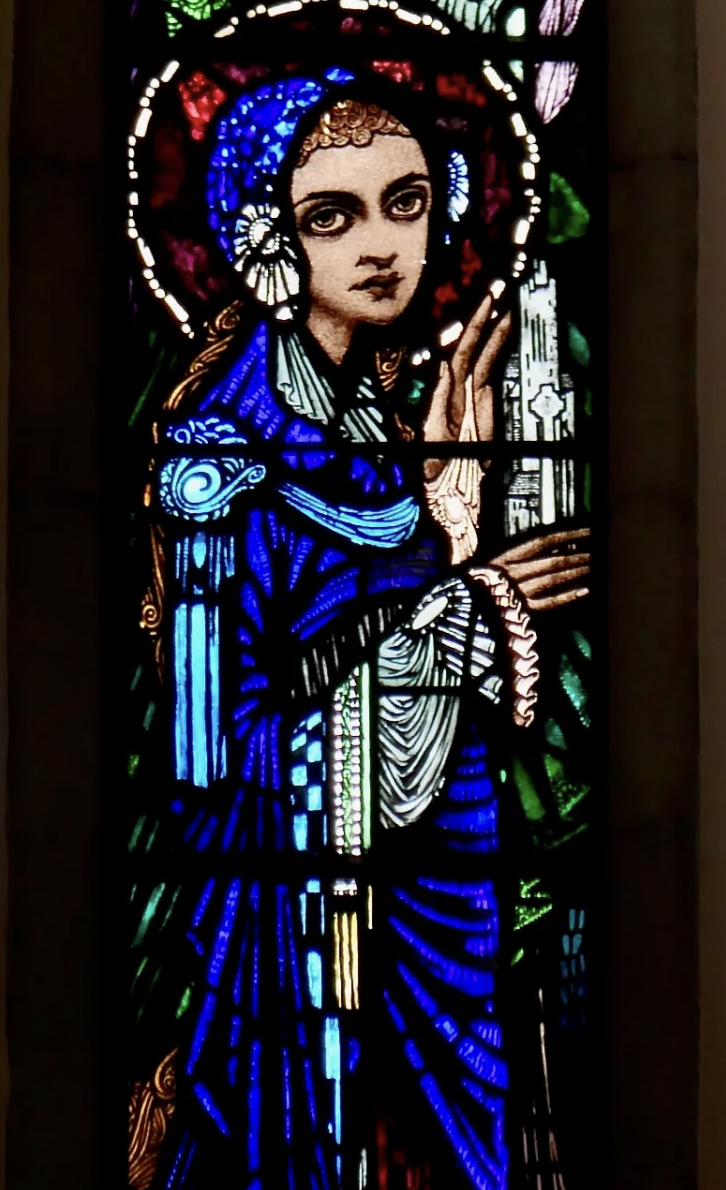
Tower of Glass Studio, The Ascension with Irish Saints and St Michael and St James (1924), detail of St. Brigid

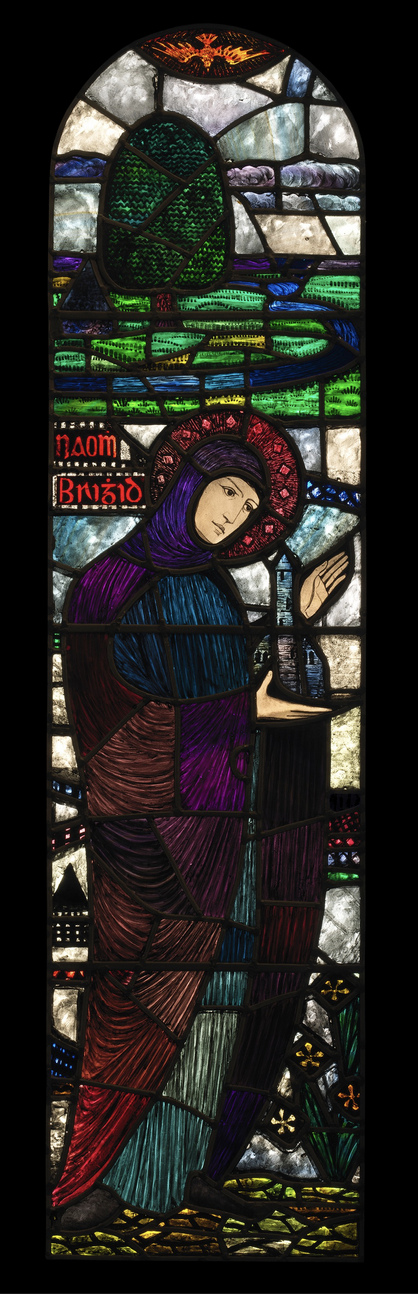
Michael Healy, Naomh Brigid (1924-5)

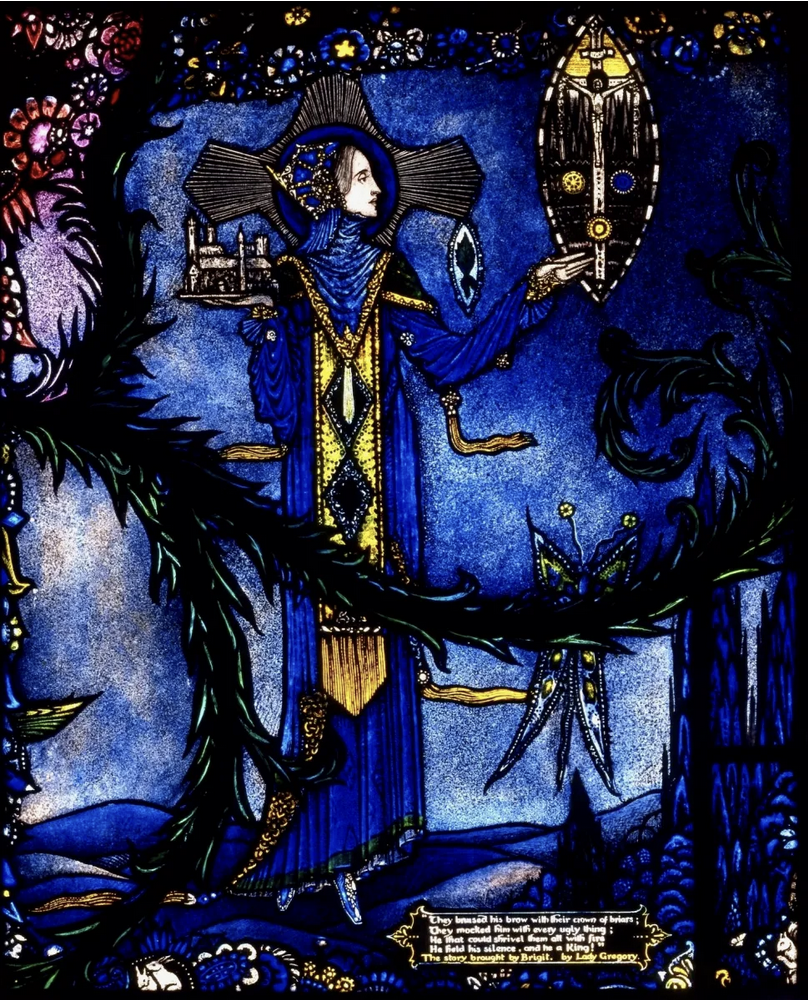
Harry Clarke, The Geneva Window (1927–30), detail of St. Brigid
