= Imbolc =

Gaelic festival and feast day of Saint Brigid

Imbolc / Saint Brigid's Day
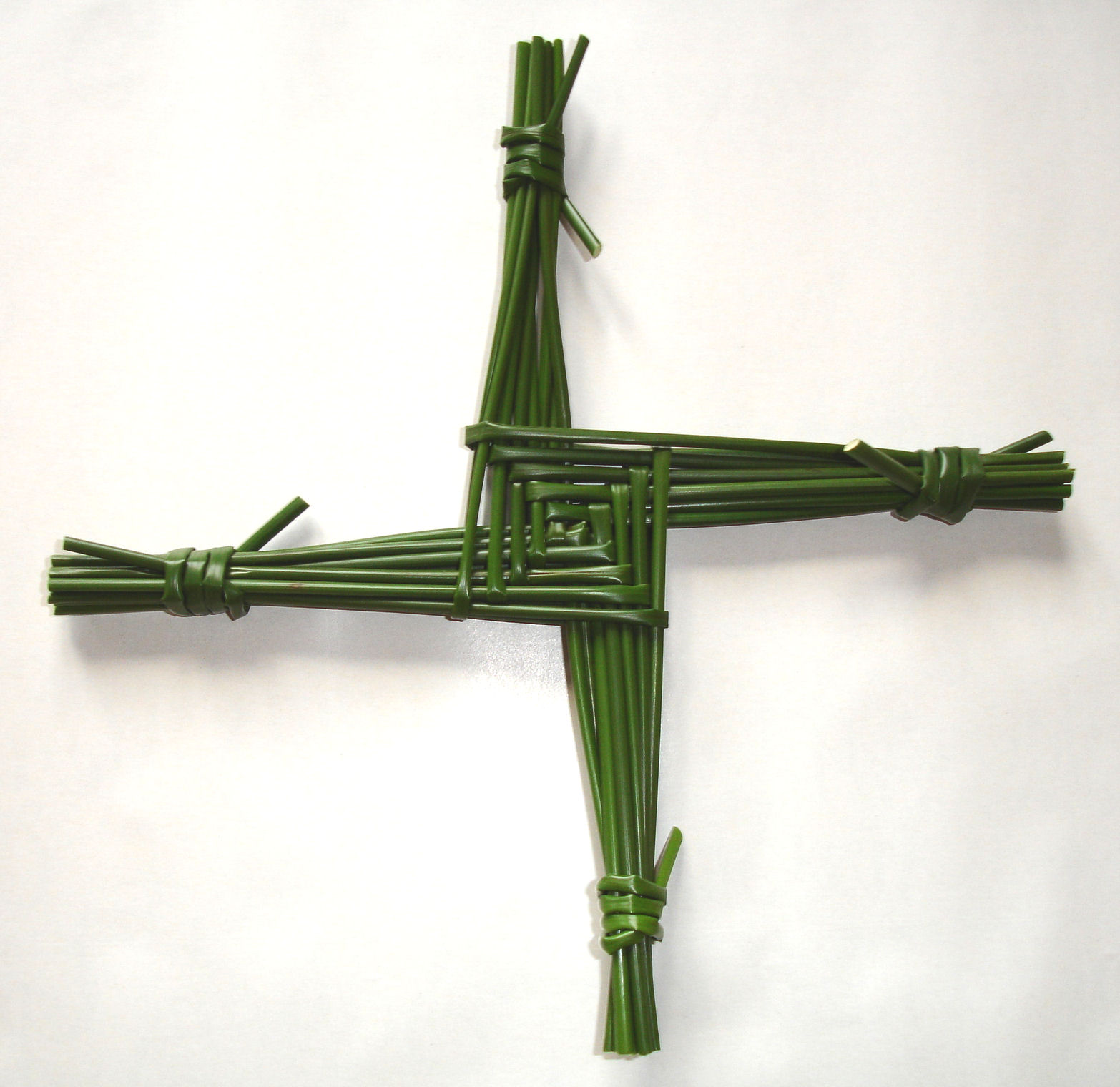
- Brigid's cross
- Also called: Lá Fhéile Bríde (Irish); Là Fhèill Brìghde (Scottish Gaelic); Laa'l Breeshey (Manx)
- Observed by: Historically: Gaels; Today: Irish people, Scottish people, Manx people, Modern Pagans
- Type: Cultural, Christian (Roman Catholic, Anglican), Pagan (Celtic neopaganism, Wicca)
- Significance: coming of spring, feast day of Saint Brigid
- Celebrations: feasting, making Brigid's crosses and Brídeógs, visiting holy wells, spring cleaning, church services
- Date: 1 February (or 1 August for some Neopagans in the S. Hemisphere)
- Related to: Gŵyl Fair y Canhwyllau, Candlemas, Groundhog Day

Imbolc or Imbolg (Irish pronunciation: [ə ˈmˠɔlˠəɡ]), also called Saint Brigid's Day (Irish: Lá Fhéile Bríde; Scottish Gaelic: Là Fhèill Brìghde; Manx: Laa'l Breeshey), is a Gaelic traditional festival on 1 February. It marks the beginning of spring and is the feast day of Saint Brigid, Ireland's patroness saint. Historically, its many folk traditions were widely observed throughout Ireland, Scotland and the Isle of Man. Imbolc falls about halfway between the winter solstice and the spring equinox and is one of the four Gaelic seasonal festivals, along with Bealtaine, Lughnasadh and Samhain.

Imbolc is mentioned in early Irish literature, although less often than the other seasonal festivals. Historians suggest that Imbolc was originally a pre-Christian (or pagan) festival associated with the lambing season, the coming of spring, and possibly the goddess Brigid, proposing that the saint and her feast day might be Christianizations. A feast of Saint Brigid was first mentioned in the Middle Ages, but its customs were not recorded in detail until the early modern era. In recent centuries, Brigid's crosses have been woven on St Brigid's Day and hung over doors and windows to protect against fire, illness, and evil. People also made a doll of Brigid (a Brídeóg), which was paraded around the community by girls, sometimes accompanied by 'strawboys'. Brigid was said to visit one's home on St Brigid's Eve. To receive her blessings, people would make a bed for Brigid, leave her food and drink, and set items of clothing outside for her to bless. Holy wells would be visited, a special meal would be had, and the day was traditionally linked with weather lore.

Although many of its traditions died out in the 20th century, it is still observed by some Christians as a religious holiday and by some non-Christians as a cultural one, and its customs have been revived in some places. Since the late 20th century, Celtic neopagans and Wiccans have observed Imbolc as a religious holiday. Since 2023, "Imbolc/St Brigid's Day" has been an annual public holiday in Ireland.

== Name ==
The etymology of Imbolc or Imbolg is unclear. A common explanation is that it comes from the Old Irish i mbolc (Modern Irish: i mbolg), meaning 'in the belly', and refers to the pregnancy of ewes at this time of year. Joseph Vendryes derived it from Old Irish imb- (intensive prefix) and folc ('wash, cleanse'), linking it to folcaim ('to wash/cleanse oneself') and suggesting it referred to a ritual cleansing. Eric P. Hamp derives it from a Proto-Indo-European root meaning both 'milk' and 'cleansing'. The early 10th century Cormac's Glossary has an entry for Oímelc, calling it the beginning of spring and deriving it from oí-melg ('ewe milk'), explaining it as "the time that sheep's milk comes". However, linguists believe this is a folk etymology; the writer's respelling of the word to give it an understandable origin.

The 12th century Book of Leinster version of the Táin Bó Cúailnge ('Cattle Raid of Cooley') indicates that Imbolc (spelt imolg and imbuilg) is three months after the 1 November festival of Samhain. In the Stowe version, a 14th century modernisation of the same text, Imbolc is changed to Fél Brigde (St Brigid's Feast), which suggests that St Brigid's Day replaced or absorbed Imbolc.

Another Old Irish poem about the Táin in the Metrical Dindshenchas says: "iar n-imbulc, ba garb a ngeilt", which Edward Gwynn translates "after Candlemas, rough was their herding". Candlemas is the Christian holy day which falls on 2 February and is known in Irish as Lá Fhéile Muire na gCoinneal, 'feast day of Mary of the Candles'.

In a 17th century manuscript of the story Agallamh na Seanórach, Imbolc is spelled Iomfhoilcc.

Peter O'Connell's Irish-English dictionary (1843) identifies Oimelc or Imbulc with Féil Brighde, the Feast of Saint Brigid.

== Origins ==
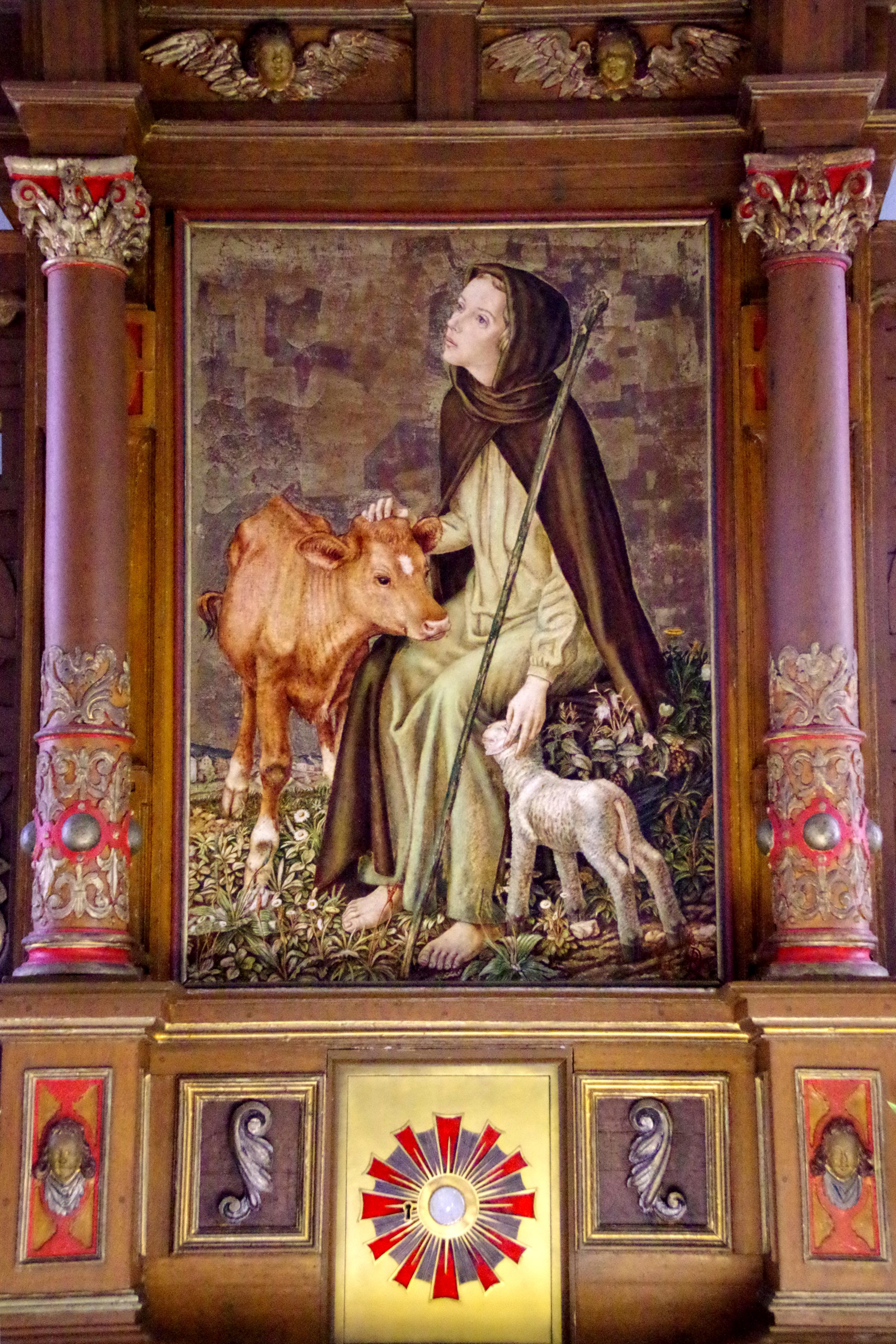
Saint Brigid depicted as a shepherdess with a lamb and calf

Historians such as Ronald Hutton and Dáithí Ó hÓgáin argue that Imbolc must have pre-Christian origins. It is suggested that Imbolc originally marked the onset of the lambing season, the arrival of fresh sheep milk after a period of food shortage, and the beginning of preparations for the spring sowing. Joseph Vendryes and Christian-Joseph Guyonvarc'h suggested that it may have also been a purification festival, similar to the ancient Roman festival Februa or Lupercalia, which took place at the same time of year.

Some scholars argue that the date of Imbolc was significant in Ireland since the Neolithic. A few passage tombs in Ireland are aligned with the sunrise around the times of Imbolc and Samhain. This includes the Mound of the Hostages on the Hill of Tara, and Cairn L at Slieve na Calliagh. Frank Prendergast argues that this alignment is so rare that it is a product of chance.

Hutton writes that Imbolc must have been "important enough for its date to be dedicated subsequently to Brigid … the Mother Saint of Ireland". Cogitosus, writing in the late 7th century, is the first to mention a feast day of Saint Brigid being observed in Kildare on 1 February. Brigid is said to have lived in the 6th century AD, and founded the important monastery of Kildare. She became the focus of a major cult. However, according to The Oxford Dictionary of Saints, there are few secular historical facts about her, and her early hagiographies "are mainly anecdotes and miracle stories, some of which are deeply rooted in Irish pagan folklore". It has been suggested by some authors that Saint Brigid is based on the goddess Brigid, or that she was a real person and some of the lore of the goddess was transferred to her. Like the saint, the goddess is associated with wisdom, poetry, healing, protection, blacksmithing, and domesticated animals, according to Cormac's Glossary and Lebor Gabála Érenn. It is suggested that Imbolc, which celebrates the start of lambing, was linked with Brigid in her role as a fertility goddess. Hutton says that the goddess might have already been linked to Imbolc and this was continued by making it the saint's feast day (see Interpretatio Christiana). Or it could be that Imbolc's association with milk drew the saint to it, because of a legend that she had been the wet-nurse of Jesus Christ.

Prominent folklorist Seán Ó Súilleabháin wrote: "The main significance of the Feast of St. Brigid would seem to be that it was a Christianisation of one of the focal points of the agricultural year in Ireland, the starting point of preparations for the spring sowing. Every manifestation of the cult of the saint (or of the deity she replaced) is bound up in some way with food production".

== Historical customs ==
The festival of Imbolc is mentioned in several early Irish manuscripts, but they say very little about its original rites and customs. Imbolc was one of four main seasonal festivals in Gaelic Ireland, along with Beltane (1 May), Lughnasadh (1 August) and Samhain (1 November). The tale Tochmarc Emire, which survives in a 10th-century version, names Imbolc as one of four seasonal festivals, and says it is "when the ewes are milked at spring's beginning". This linking of Imbolc with the arrival of lambs and sheep's milk probably reflected farming customs that ensured lambs were born before calves. In late winter/early spring, sheep could survive better than cows on the sparse vegetation, and farmers sought to resume milking as soon as possible due to their dwindling stores. As a seasonal festival, the timing of Imbolc might originally have been more fluid and linked to the onset of lambing and the blooming of blackthorn.

The Hibernica Minora includes an Old Irish poem about the four seasonal festivals. Translated by Kuno Meyer (1894), it says, "Tasting of each food according to order, this is what is proper at Imbolc: washing the hands, the feet, the head". This suggests ritual cleansing.

From the 18th century to the mid-20th century, many St Brigid's Day traditions were recorded by folklorists and other writers. They tell us how it was celebrated then and shed light on how it may have been celebrated in the past.

=== Brigid's crosses ===
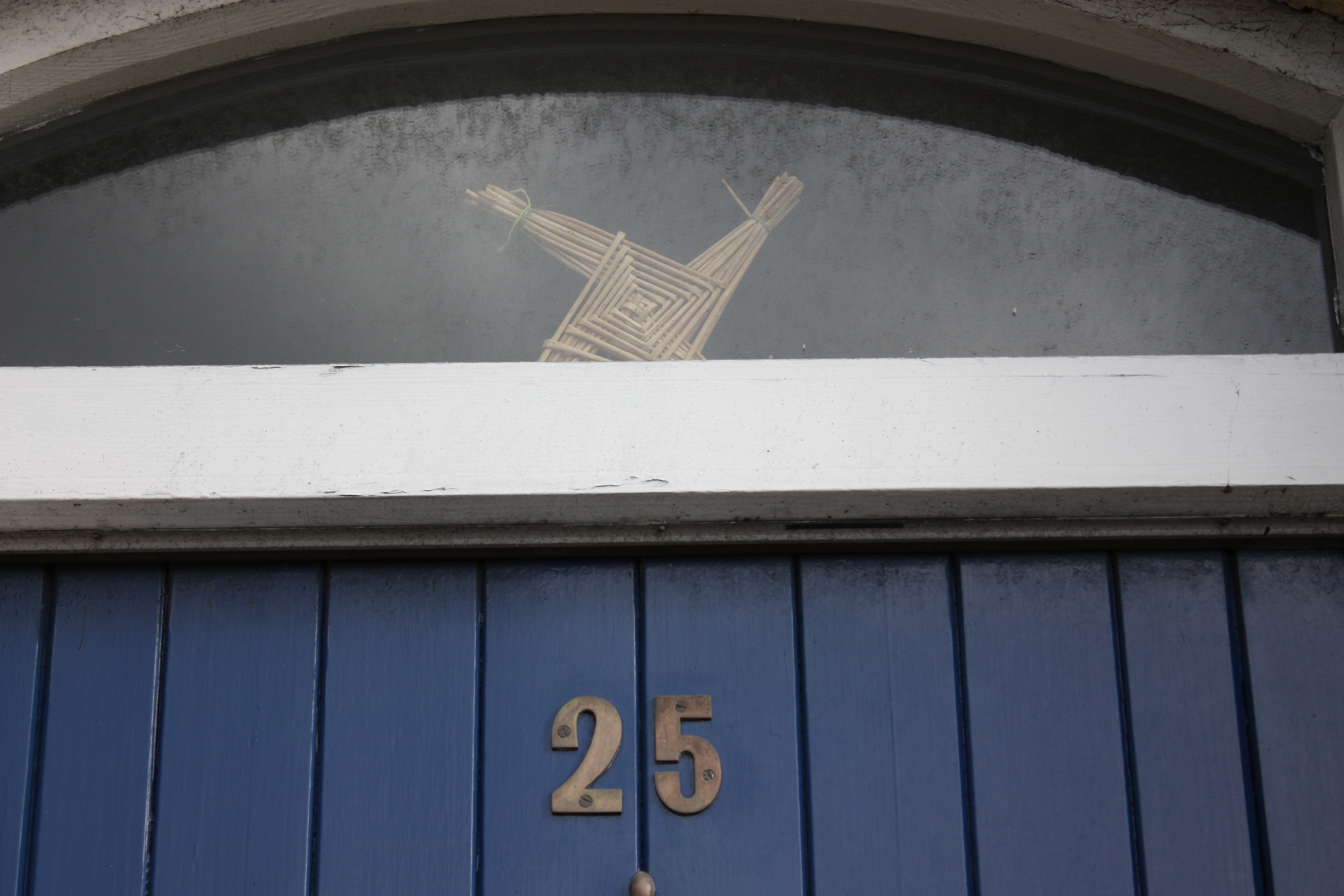
Brigid's cross above a doorway in Downpatrick.

In Ireland, Brigid's crosses (pictured) are traditionally made on St Brigid's Day. A Brigid's cross usually consists of rushes woven into a four-armed equilateral cross, although there were also three-armed crosses. They are traditionally hung over doors, windows, and stables to welcome Brigid and for protection against fire, lightning, illness, and evil spirits. The crosses are generally left until the next St Brigid's Day. In western Connacht, people made a Crios Bríde (Bríd's girdle); a great ring of rushes with a cross woven in the middle. Young boys would carry it around the village, inviting people to step through it and be blessed.

=== Welcoming Brigid ===
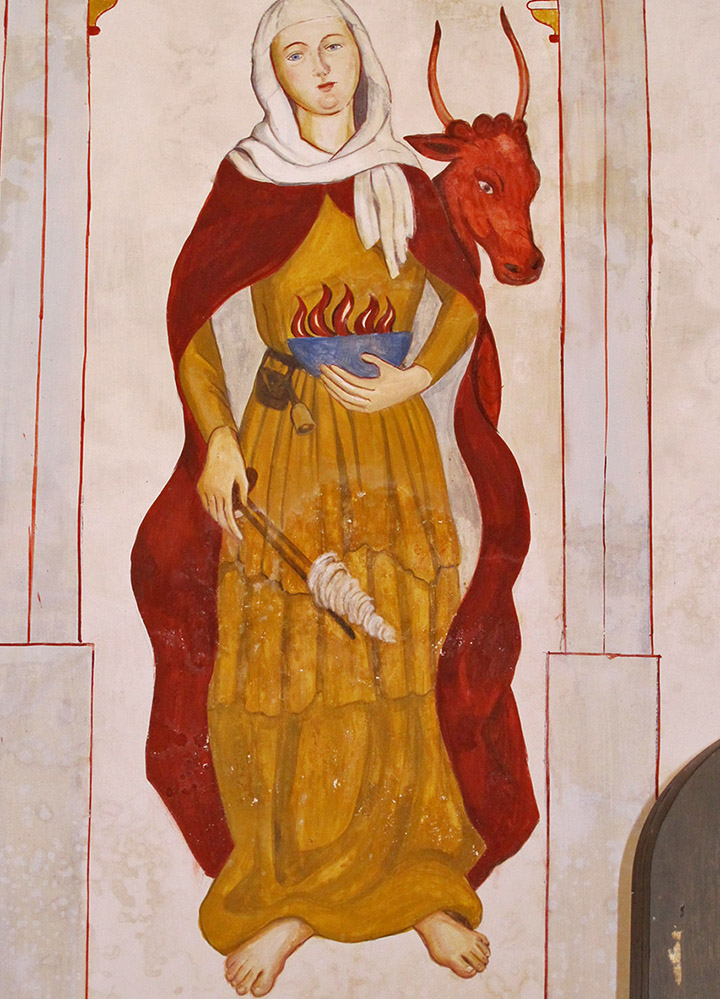
Painting of Saint Brigid with a bowl of fire, a spindle, and a cow in St. Patrick's Chapel, Glastonbury.

On St Brigid's Eve, Brigid was said to visit virtuous households and bless the inhabitants. As Brigid represented the light half of the year and the power that will bring people from the dark season of winter into spring, her presence was vital at this time of year.

Before going to bed, people would leave items of clothing or strips of cloth outside for Brigid to bless. The next morning, they would be brought inside and believed to have powers of healing and protection.

Brigid would be symbolically invited into the house and a bed would often be made for her. In Ulster, a family member representing Brigid would circle the home three times carrying rushes. They would knock the door three times, asking to be let in. On the third attempt, they are welcomed in, a meal is had, and the rushes are then made into crosses or a bed for Brigid. In 18th-century Mann, the custom was to stand at the door with a bundle of rushes and say "Brede, Brede, come to my house tonight. Open the door for Brede and let Brede come in". Similarly, in County Donegal, the family member who was sent to fetch the rushes knelt on the front step and repeated three times, "Go on your knees, open your eyes, and let in St Brigid". Those inside the house answered three times, "She's welcome". The rushes were then strewn on the floor as a carpet or bed for Brigid. In the 19th century, some old Manx women would make a bed for Brigid in the barn with food, ale, and a candle on a table. The custom of making Brigid's bed was prevalent in the Hebrides of Scotland, where it was recorded as far back as the 17th century. A bed of hay or a basket-like cradle would be made for Brigid. Someone would then call out three times: "a Bhríd, a Bhríd, thig a stigh as gabh do leabaidh" ("Bríd Bríd, come in; thy bed is ready"). A corn dolly called the dealbh Bríde (icon of Brigid) would be laid in the bed and a white wand, usually made of birch, would be laid beside it. It represented the wand that Brigid was said to use to make the vegetation start growing again. Women in some parts of the Hebrides would also dance while holding a large cloth and calling out "Bridean, Bridean, thig an nall 's dean do leabaidh" ("Bríd, Bríd, come over and make your bed").

In the Outer Hebrides, ashes from the fire would be raked smooth, and, in the morning, people would look for some mark on the ashes as a sign that Brigid had visited. If there was no mark, they believed bad fortune would come unless they buried a cockerel at the meeting of three streams as an offering and burned incense on their fire that night.

=== Brigid's procession ===
In Ireland and Scotland, a representation of Brigid would be paraded around the community by girls and young women. Usually, it was a doll known as a Brídeóg ('little Brigid'), called a 'Breedhoge' or 'Biddy' in English. It would be made from rushes or reeds and clad in bits of cloth, flowers, or shells. In the Hebrides of Scotland, a bright shell or crystal called the reul-iuil Bríde (guiding star of Brigid) was set on its chest. The girls would carry it in procession while singing a hymn to Brigid. All wore white with their hair unbound as a symbol of purity and youth. They visited every house in the area, where they received either food or more decoration for the Brídeóg. Afterward, they feasted in a house with the Brídeóg set in a place of honour, and put it to bed with lullabies. When the meal was done, the local young men humbly asked for admission, made obeisance to the Brídeóg, and joined the girls in dancing and merrymaking. In many places, only unwed girls could carry the Brídeóg, but in some both boys and girls carried it.

In parts of Ireland, rather than carrying a Brídeóg, a girl took on the role of Brigid. Escorted by other girls, she went house-to-house wearing 'Brigid's crown' and carrying 'Brigid's shield' and 'Brigid's cross', all made from rushes. The procession in some places included 'strawboys', who wore conical straw hats, masks and played folk music; much like the wrenboys. Up until the mid-20th century, children in Ireland still went house-to-house asking for pennies for "poor Biddy", or money for the poor. In County Kerry, men in white robes sang from house to house.

=== Weather lore ===
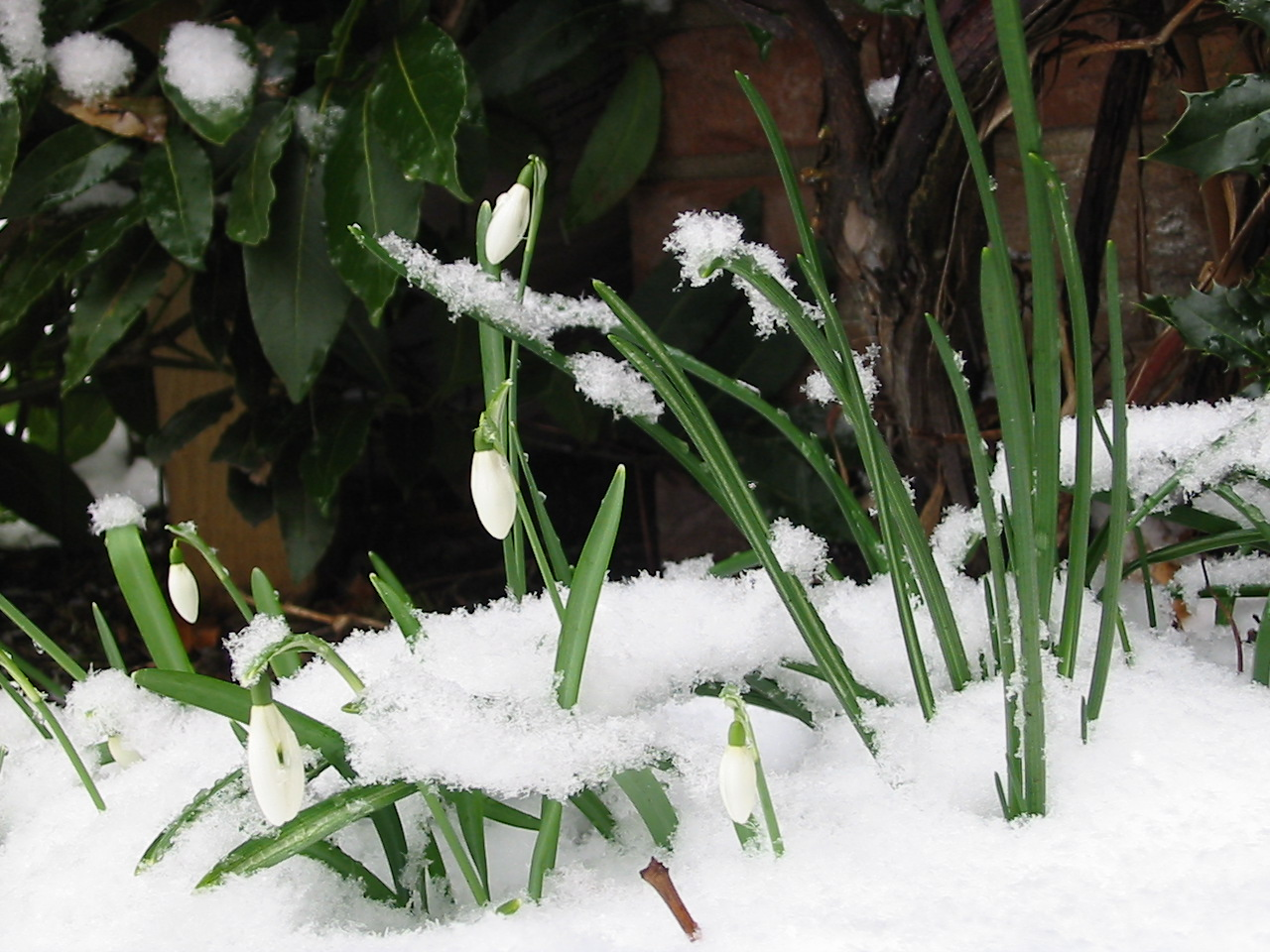
Snowdrops in the snow

The festival is traditionally associated with weather lore. In Ireland, folklorist Kevin Danaher records lore of hedgehogs:

In Irish folk tradition St. Brighid's Day, 1 February, is the first day of Spring, and thus of the farmer's year. ... To see a hedgehog was a good weather sign, for the hedgehog comes come out of the hole in which he has spent the winter, looks about to judge the weather, and returns to his burrow if bad weather is going to continue. If he stays out, it means that he knows the mild weather is coming.

A Scottish Gaelic proverb about the day is:

Thig an nathair as an toll
Là donn Brìde,
Ged robh trì troighean dhen t-sneachd
Air leac an làir.

Translation:

The serpent will come from the hole
On the brown Day of Bríde,
Though there should be three feet of snow
On the flat surface of the ground.

Imbolc was believed to be when the Cailleach—the divine hag of Gaelic tradition—gathers her firewood for the rest of the winter. Legend has it that if she wishes to make the winter last a good while longer, she will make sure the weather on Imbolc is bright and sunny so that she can gather plenty of firewood. Therefore, people would be relieved if Imbolc is a day of foul weather, as it means the Cailleach is asleep and winter is almost over. At Imbolc on the Isle of Man, where she is known as Caillagh ny Groamagh, the Cailleach is said to take the form of a gigantic bird carrying sticks in her beak.

=== Other customs ===
Families would have a special meal or supper on St Brigid's Eve to mark the last night of winter. This typically included food such as colcannon, sowans, dumplings, barmbrack or bannocks. Often, some of the food and drink would be set aside for Brigid.

In Ireland, a spring cleaning was customary around St Brigid's Day.

People traditionally visit holy wells and pray for health while walking 'sunwise' around the well. They might then leave offerings, typically coins or strips of cloth/ribbon (see clootie well). Historically, water from the well was used to bless the home, family members, livestock, and fields.

Scottish writer Donald Alexander Mackenzie also recorded in the 19th century that offerings were made "to earth and sea". The offering could be milk poured into the ground or porridge poured into the water as a libation.

In County Kilkenny, graves were decorated with box and laurel flowers (or any other flowers that could be found at that time). A Branch of Virginity was decorated with white ribbons and placed on the grave of a recently deceased maiden.

== Present day customs ==
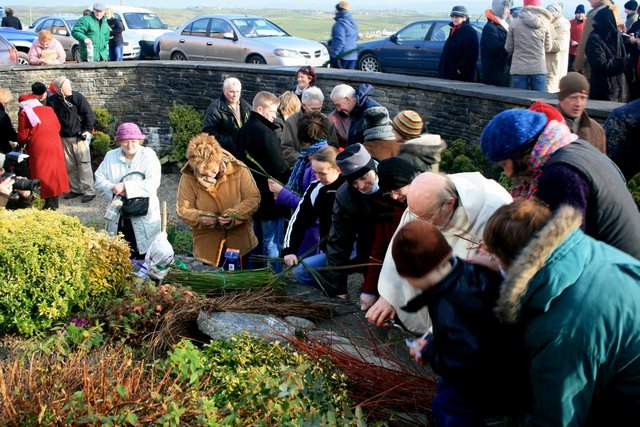
People making Brigid's crosses at St Brigid's Well near Liscannor.

Saint Brigid's Day/Imbolc public holiday
- Observed by: Ireland
- Date: First Monday in February
- 2025 date: February 3
- 2026 date: February 2
- 2027 date: February 1
- 2028 date: February 7
- Frequency: Annual
- First time: 2023

St Brigid's Day and Imbolc are observed by Christians and non-Christians. Some people still make Brigid's crosses and Brídeogs or visit holy wells dedicated to St Brigid on 1 February. Brigid's Day parades have been revived in the town of Killorglin, County Kerry, which holds a yearly "Biddy's Day Festival". Men and women wearing elaborate straw hats and masks visit public houses carrying a Brídeóg to ward off evil spirits and bring good luck for the coming year. There are folk music sessions, historical talks, film screenings, drama productions, and cross-weaving workshops. The main event is a torchlight parade of 'Biddy groups' through the town. Since 2009 a yearly "Brigid of Faughart Festival" is held in County Louth. This celebrates Brigid as both saint and goddess and includes the long-standing pilgrimage to Faughart as well as music, poetry, and lectures. The "Imbolc International Music Festival" of folk music is held in Derry at this time of year. In England, the village of Marsden, West Yorkshire holds a biennial "Imbolc Fire Festival" which includes a lantern procession, fire performers, music, fireworks, and a symbolic battle between giant characters representing the Green Man and Jack Frost.

More recently, Irish embassies have hosted yearly events on St Brigid's Day to celebrate famous women of the Irish diaspora and showcase the work of Irish female emigrants in the arts. In 2022, Dublin hosted its first "Brigit Festival", celebrating "the contributions of Irish women" past and present through exhibitions, tours, lectures, films, and a concert.

In 2016, the Green Party proposed that St Brigid's Day be made a public holiday in Ireland. With major campaigning effort by Herstory, with wide public support, including from many prominent politicians and Imelda May, in January 2022 the government announced that "Imbolc/ St Brigid's Day" would be established, beginning the following year. This holiday falls on "the first Monday in every February, except where St. Brigid’s Day, the 1st day of February, happens to fall on a Friday, in which case that Friday 1 February will be a public holiday." It has been a yearly public holiday since 2023 to mark both the saint's feast day and the seasonal festival. A government statement noted that it would be the first Irish public holiday named after a woman, and "means that all four of the traditional Celtic seasonal festival will now be public holidays."

=== Neopaganism ===
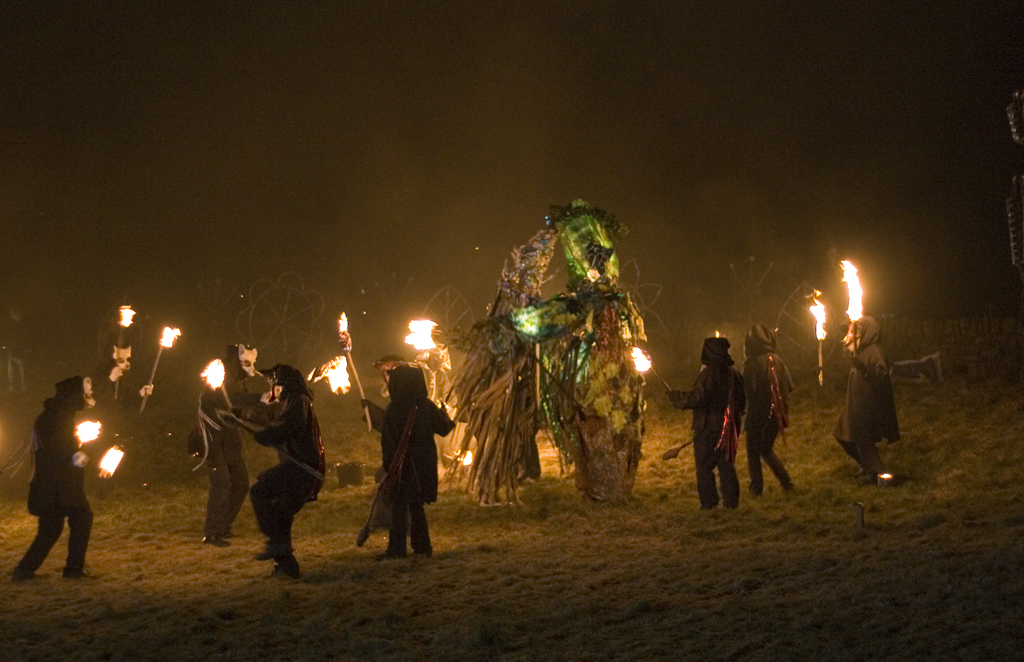
Imbolc Festival in Marsden, West Yorkshire, 2007

Imbolc or Imbolc-based festivals are observed by some Neopagans, though practices vary widely. While some attempt to closely emulate the historic accounts of Imbolc, others rely on many sources to inspire their celebrations. Festivals typically fall near 1 February in the Northern Hemisphere and 1 August in the Southern Hemisphere.

Some Neopagans celebrate the festival at the astronomical midpoint between the winter solstice and spring equinox — in the Northern Hemisphere, this is usually on 3 or 4 February — while others rely on the full moon nearest this point. Some Neopagans designate Imbolc based on other natural phenomena, such as the emergence of primroses, dandelions, or similar local flora.

==== Celtic Reconstructionist ====
Celtic Reconstructionists strive to reconstruct ancient Celtic religion. Their religious practices are based on research and historical accounts, but may be modified slightly to suit modern life. They avoid syncretism (i.e., combining practises from different cultures). Many use traditional songs and rites from sources such as The Silver Bough and The Carmina Gadelica. It is a time of honouring the goddess Brigid, and many of her dedicants choose this time of year for rituals to her.

==== Wicca and Neo-Druidry ====
Wiccans and Neo-Druids celebrate Imbolc as one of the eight Sabbats in their Wheel of the Year, following Midwinter and preceding Ostara. In Wicca, Imbolc is commonly associated with the goddess Brigid; as such, it is sometimes seen as a "women's holiday" with specific rites only for female members of a coven. Among Dianic Wiccans, Imbolc is the traditional time for initiations.

== See also ==
- Candlemas
- Faoilleach
- Irish calendar
- Lìchūn (立春)
- Quarter days
- Vasant Panchami
- Wheel of the Year (Cross-Quarter days)
