= Brigid's cross =

Cross woven from rushes, arms offset

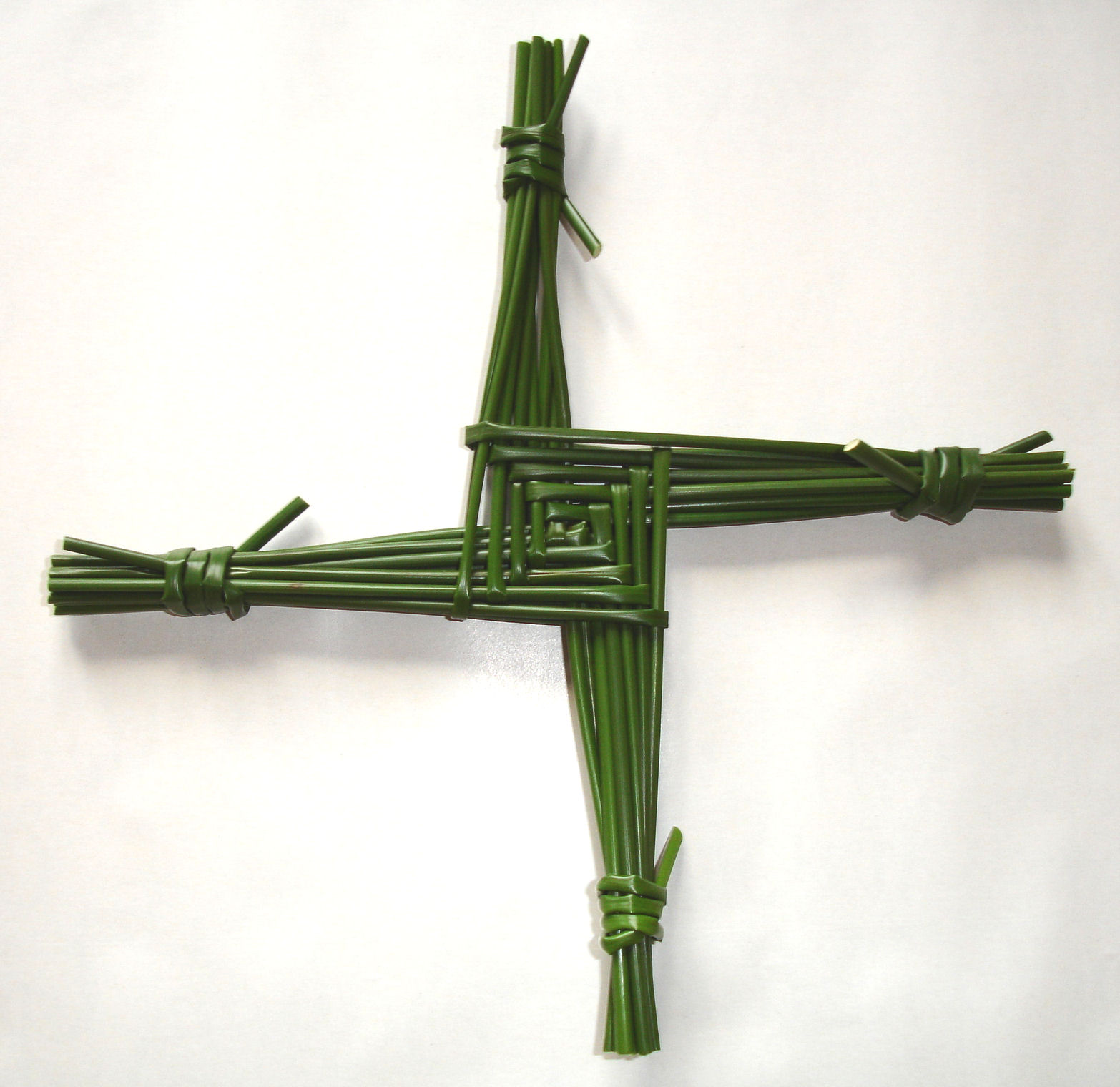
Brigid's cross

St. Brigid's cross or St. Brigit's cross (Irish: Cros Bhríde, Crosóg Bhríde or Bogha Bhríde) is a small variant of the Christian cross often woven from straw or rushes. It appears in many different shapes; the earliest designs were simple Christian Latin or Greek crosses, but the most popular modern iteration features a woven diamond or lozenge in the centre. The cross is named for the Christian saint Brigid of Kildare.

A Saint Brigid's cross is typically woven on 1 February, her feast day, as well as the festival of Imbolc in pre-Christian Ireland. Hanging St. Brigid's cross from the rafters of one's house was believed to bring the blessing and protection of the saint for the remainder of the year. The practice of crafting St. Brigid's crosses is first attested in the 17th century and seems to have been in decline by the 20th century, in part due to house renovations that made hanging them difficult.

In addition to the shamrock and Celtic harp, St. Brigid's cross is a national symbol of Ireland. From 1962 to 1995, it was incorporated into the Raidió Teilifís Éireann logo. A collection of St. Brigid's crosses collected by the Irish Folklore Commission is on display at the National Museum of Ireland – Country Life.

== Design ==
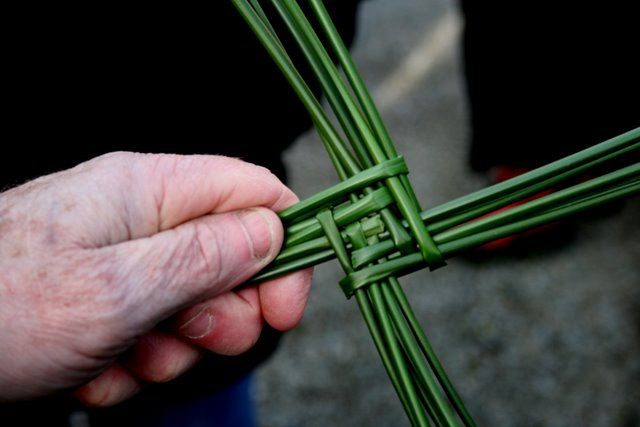
The arms of the cross are not parallel to one another, giving the impression of motion.

Brigid's crosses broadly refer to a type of cross woven out of straw or rushes. They are defined by building material more than appearance, and the exact shape of a Brigid's cross varies greatly. The National Museum of Ireland has identified seven basic categories of cross: diamond, which is subdivided into single or multiple; "swastika" type, with four or three arms; wheel type; interlaced type; traditional Latin crosses made from straw or rush; bare wooden crosses in the Latin or Greek style which are bound with straw; and a final "miscellaneous" category.

There are several variations on the Brigid's cross, including this three-armed version.

The most popular of these is the diamond or lozenge cross, the dominant variant throughout Munster and Connacht. Two sticks are crossed over one another to provide a wooden framework for this cross, and at its centre, straw is woven into the shape of a diamond. Sometimes, additional woven diamonds are added to the four arms of the cross. Some historians have compared the lozenge shape at the centre of the diamond cross to that of the Mexican god's eye or the Eurasian "magic square".

Another popular variant is the "swastika" cross. Rather than being set parallel to one another like a traditional cross, the arms of the swastika cross are set at right angles from a lozenge or diamond at the centre. These offset angles evoke the image of a wheel in motion and may have originally represented the sun, or "the great wheel in the sky". In certain regions of Ulster, this wheel spinning in a circle imagery is evoked with a three-armed woven cross. This three-armed variant has been compared to the triskelion, a popular motif in Celtic imagery. In rare cases, Brigid's cross may be set fully inside a circle; this is known as a "wheel cross" or "St. Brigid's Bow".

Unlike other Brigid's crosses, which were typically made of straw, the interlaced cross is often made of rushes. Unlike other forms of the cross which contain a woven shape in the centre, the interlaced cross consists only of rush or straw strands woven into a Christian cross shape. While straw is the more popular weaving material for most variants of Brigid's cross, the interlaced cross is more frequently made from rushes. An even simpler variant is the bare cross, which consists either of two bound plaits of straw or of two planks of wood bound together in the centre by straw. Occasionally, no straw is used at all: the Sheaf-Cross, located in eastern County Galway and County Roscommon, involves two small sheathes of unthreshed corn are bound together by a split thatching branch.

== Folklore ==
Brigid's cross is named for Brigid of Kildare, the only female patron saint of Ireland, who was born c. 450 in Leinster. Unlike her contemporary, Saint Patrick, Brigid left no historical record, and most information about her life and work derives from a hagiography written by the monk Cogitosus some 200 years after her birth. The prevailing Christian folklore surrounding Brigid's cross involves the deathbed conversion of an Irish pagan chieftain, in some stories her father. While telling the pagan about the Crucifixion of Jesus, Brigid collected rushes from the ground and wove them into a cross, after which the chieftain requested a Christian baptism. In another story, Brigid was given a poisoned drink by a woman of ill intent, and she wove the cross to neutralise the toxins.

== Ritual use ==
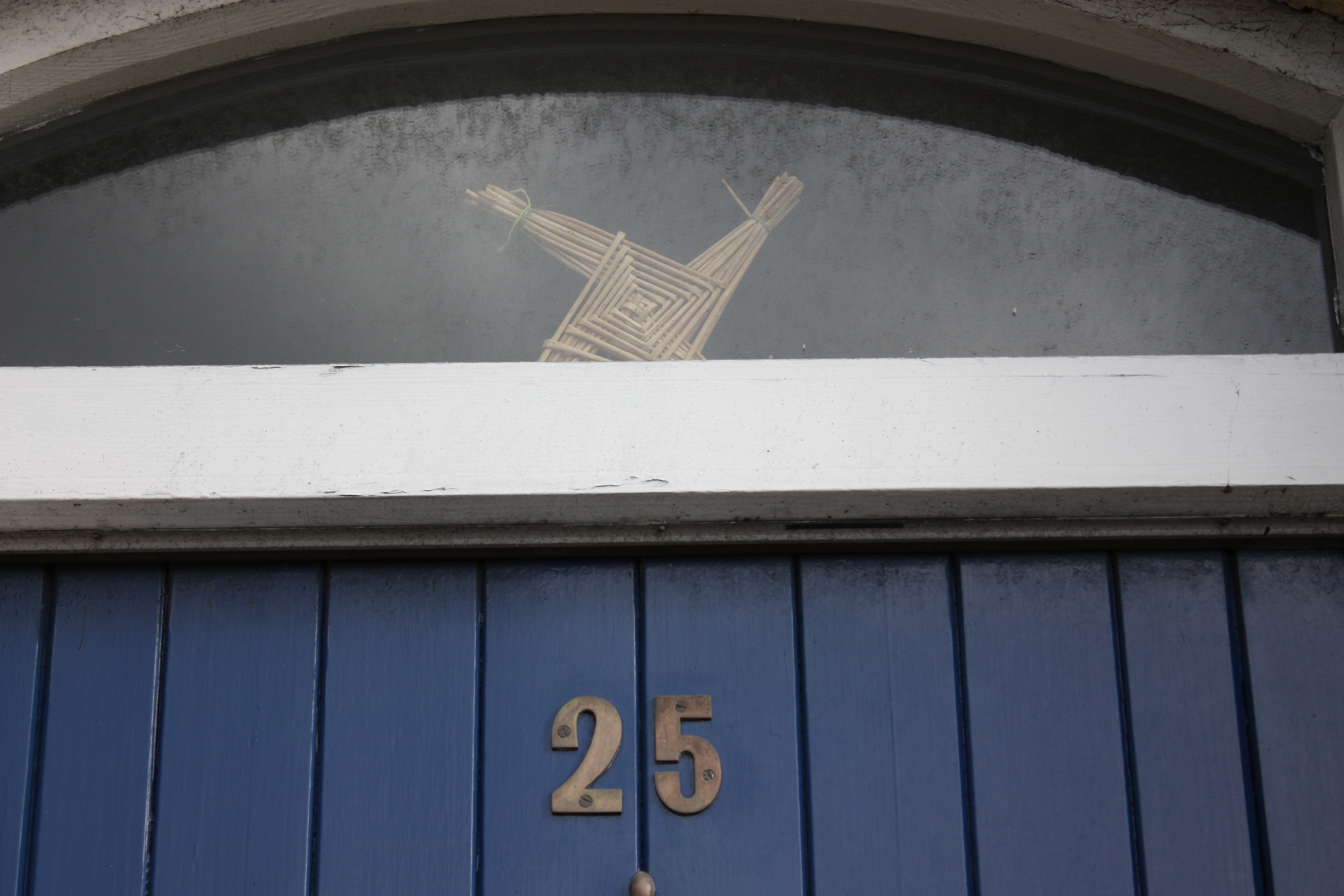
Brigid's cross hung over a doorway

One of the customs associated with Brigid of Kildare's feast day was to hang Brigid's crosses in the rafters or over entryways of buildings, thus invoking the saint's blessing and protection for the remainder of the year. Families would gather rushes on 31 January, the eve of Brigid's feast day. After an evening feast, the head of household would supervise the rest of the family as they wove crosses from the collected material. These crosses were left out overnight to receive Brigid's blessing, and on 1 February, crosses would be mounted in the main dwelling place, outhouses, and stables. While the direction in which the crosses were hung remains unknown, that the centre shape is frequently described as a lozenge rather than a square suggests that Brigid's cross is properly displayed in a saltire style rather than that of the Latin cross. Crosses were either taken down annually and replaced, or they accumulated between feasts. If they were discarded, they were burned or buried, with the latter preferred due to Brigid's associations with agriculture.

The weaving of Brigid's crosses was popular throughout Ireland, particularly in the north and midland, but its popularity dwindled during the 20th century. Some families attributed the decline of Brigid's crosses to house renovations that inhibited the ability to hang them appropriately. Outside of Ireland, Brigid's crosses are also customarily hung in Glastonbury, England, in accordance with a local legend that says Brigid of Kildare visited the town in 488 CE. Families may also send woven crosses to their friends and relatives who live abroad, or they will carry a cross with them when they leave Ireland. The weaving of crosses was not restricted to Brigid's feast day: friends would often gift crosses to incur blessings and strengthen their bond, while newlywed couples would often receive "womb crosses" to hang above their door, as Brigid was also a patron of fertility.

Although they take place at different points of the season, the weaving of Brigid's cross is associated with other rituals in which the last sheaf of that year's harvest is woven into intricate shape. In County Armagh, for instance, the harvest season involves the weaving of Harvest Knots and Harvest Stars, the former of which involves a lozenge shape similar to that of Brigid's cross. These "last sheaf" celebrations are collectively known as the Cailleach.

== As a national symbol ==
The first RTÉ logo, designed in 1961

Shortly after the Irish Free State gained its independence in 1922, Brigid's cross became one of several nationalist symbols, alongside such other motifs as the shamrock and Celtic harp, used by Irish artists in order to create a national cultural identity separate from that of Britain. In the 1950s, Brigid's cross was incorporated into the logo of the Irish Department of Health, and as of 2024, the cross remained a part of the logo of the Nursing and Midwifery Board of Ireland, who frequently incorporate Brigid into their imagery for her associations with midwifery.

Brigid's cross was selected as the first station identification marker for Raidió Teilifís Éireann (RTÉ) in 1962, with Alice Curtayne writing that the cross was selected to evoke "the image of quiet, serene places in the springtime of our history, of rush-bordered rivers in a serene arcadian landscape". The RTÉ logo underwent nine redesigns between 1962 and 1987, with the cross taking varying levels of prominence compared to the station name. It was removed from the RTÉ logo in 1995 in favour of "a clean striking piece of modern design", a decision which Carol Coulter of The Irish Times opined, "Saint Brigid's cross has lost its place as a symbol of our national identity, well at least as far as our national broadcasting station is concerned."

In 1942, the Irish Folklore Commission created a questionnaire regarding the Feast of Saint Brigid, during which they collected several hundred Brigid's crosses. In 2022, the Commission selected a sample of 21 of these crosses to be displayed at the National Museum of Ireland – Country Life in Castlebar. The display coincided with an announcement from the Irish government that 1 February would be declared a national holiday.

== See also ==
- Celtic cross
- Corn dolly
