= Dar Lugdach =

Saint; successor of Brigit of Kildare (died 525/527)

Dar Lugdach (also Darlugdach died c. 525/527) was the immediate successor of Brigid of Kildare as abbess of Kildare, and is recognised as a saint. She is recorded as having died one year to the day after Brigid, and shares the same feast day as the more famous abbess. Little is known of her family history.

== Biography ==
Dar Lugdach is asserted to have been St. Brigid's favourite pupil. Ultan, in his ‘Life of Brigit,’ says that Darlugdach had fallen in love, and one evening when she was to have met her lover she left the bed in which she and St. Brigit were sleeping. In her peril, she prayed to God for guidance; in answer, God placed burning embers in her shoes as she put them on. ‘Thus by fire she put out fire, and by pain extinguished pain.’ She then returned to bed. St. Brigit, though apparently asleep, knew everything, but kept her silence. The next day Darlugdach told her all. St. Brigit then told her she was now safe from the fire of passion here and the fire of hell hereafter, then healed her feet. When St. Brigit's death approached, Darlugdach wished to die with her, but the saint replied that Darlugdach should die on the first anniversary of her own death.

Darlugdach succeeded Brigid in the abbacy of Kildare. In the Irish Nennius, there is a story of her having been an exile from Ireland and having gone to Scotland, where the Pictish king Nechtan Morbet made over Abernethy to God and St. Brigit, ‘Darlugdach being present on the occasion and singing alleluia’. W.A. Cummins places her mission to Pictland in around the year 485. Fordun places the event in the reign of Garnard Makdompnach, successor to the King Bruide, in whose time St. Columba preached to the Picts; but both saints were dead before St. Columba began his labours in Scotland. A vellum fragment inscribed with her name has been dated to c.700 AD.

Archbishop Ussher states that Darlugdach was venerated at Frisingen in Bavaria, under the name Dardalucha, but there is no reason to suppose she laboured in that country. Dedications to Irish saints on the continent were often the result of the pious zeal of members of their community, who extolled the holiness and dignity of their patron and led their foreign adherents to expect his special favour when they established a new foundation in his honour. Such was probably the case of the people of Frisingen, according to the Dictionary of National Biography.
