= Llansanffraid =

Llansanffraid and variant spellings of this place-name may refer to the following places (all in Wales):

- Llansantffraed, a parish and small settlement in Talybont-on-Usk, near Brecon, in Powys
- Llansantffraid, Ceredigion or Llansantffraed, a parish and village near Llanon in Ceredigion
- Llansantffraid Glyn Ceiriog, or Glyn Ceiriog, a village in Wrexham County Borough.
- Llansanffraid Glyndyfrdwy, a former parish in Denbighshire
- Llansantffraed, Monmouthshire, a parish and village near Raglan in Monmouthshire
- Llansantffraid railway station, a former station in Llansantffraid-ym-Mechain, Powys
- Llansantffraid-ym-Mechain, a village between Oswestry and Welshpool in Powys
- Llansanffraid Glan Conwy, former port on the River Conwy

== See also ==
- Cwmdauddwr, Powys, also known as Llansanffraid Cwmteuddwr
- St Brides-super-Ely, Vale of Glamorgan, called Llansanffraid-ar-Elái in Welsh
- St Brides Wentloog, Newport, called Llansanffraid Gwynllŵg in Welsh
