= St. Patrick's Chapel, Glastonbury =

Chapel in Glastonbury, Somerset, England

St.Patrick's Chapel
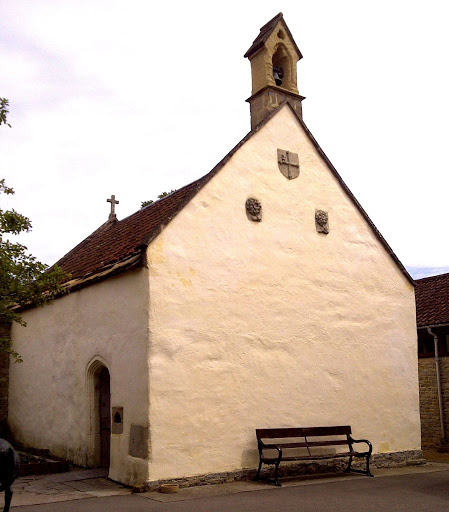

- Location within Somerset

General information
- Location: Glastonbury, Somerset, England
- Coordinates: 51°8′44″N 2°42′52″W
- Construction started: 1512
- Completed: 1517

St. Patrick's Chapel in Glastonbury, Somerset, England, is housed within the grounds of Glastonbury Abbey, and was completed in 1517. It is a site of pilgrimage and dedicated to Saint Patrick due to it being close to a possible site of his burial. It sits within the scheduled Ancient Monument area and is a Grade II listed building. The Stained Glass and wall painting are the results of a renovation. Saint Patrick is depicted twice within the chapel, once within the stained glass behind the altar which shows him in his traditional green robe standing above a snake and another on the wall which depicts him with a wolfhound. Weekly services are still held within the Chapel and it 'has been witness to 500 years of Christian worship.'

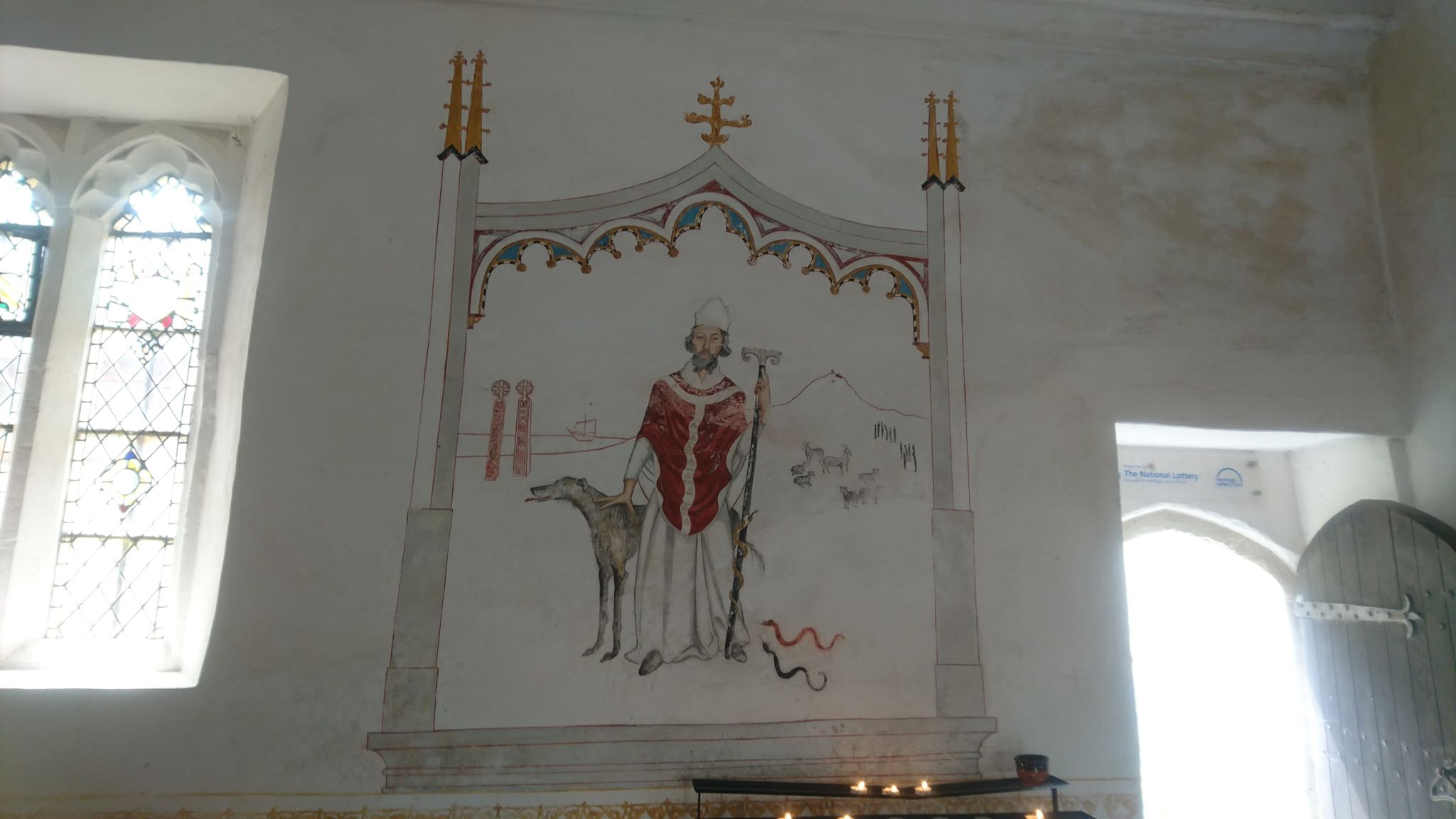

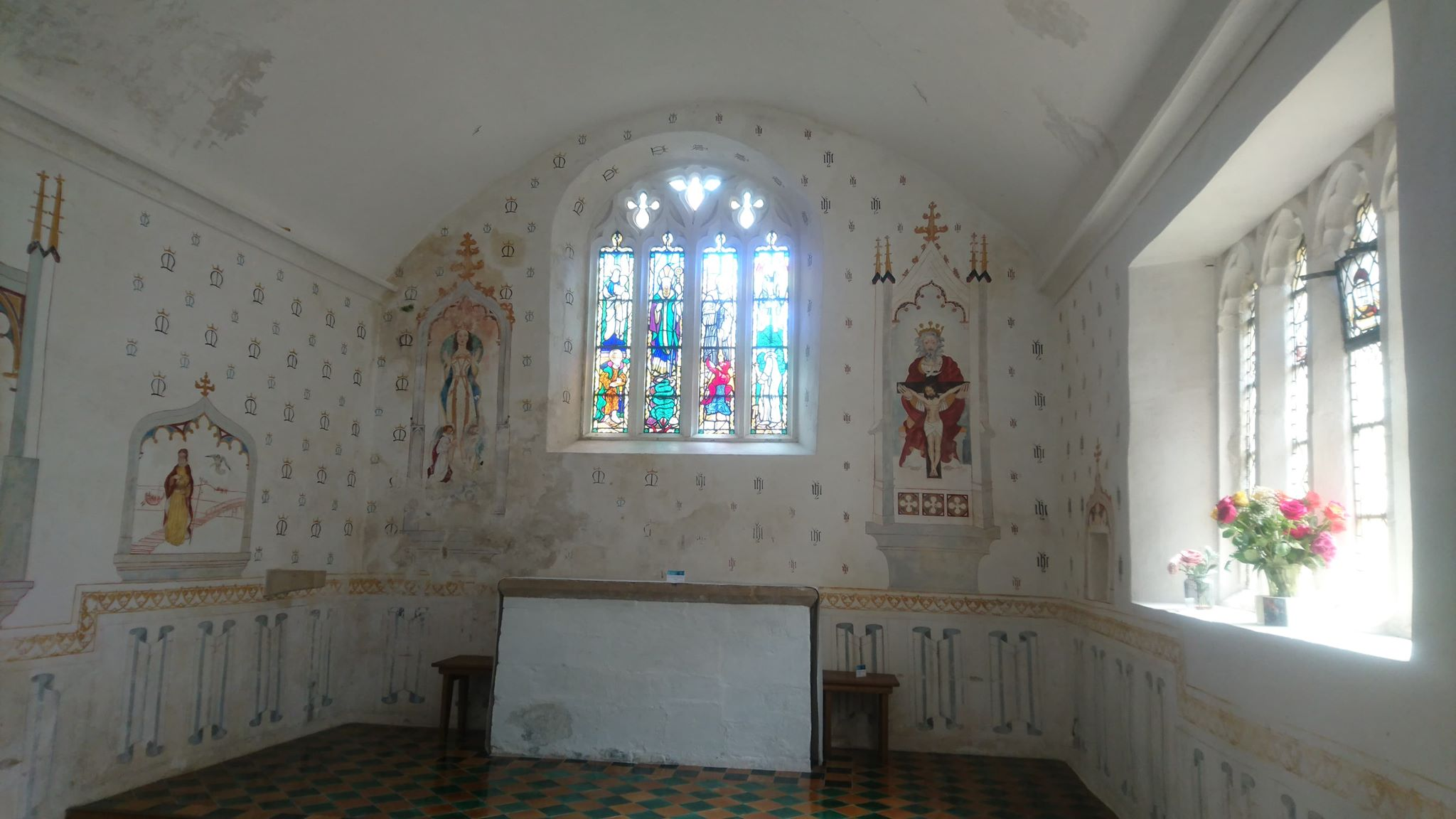

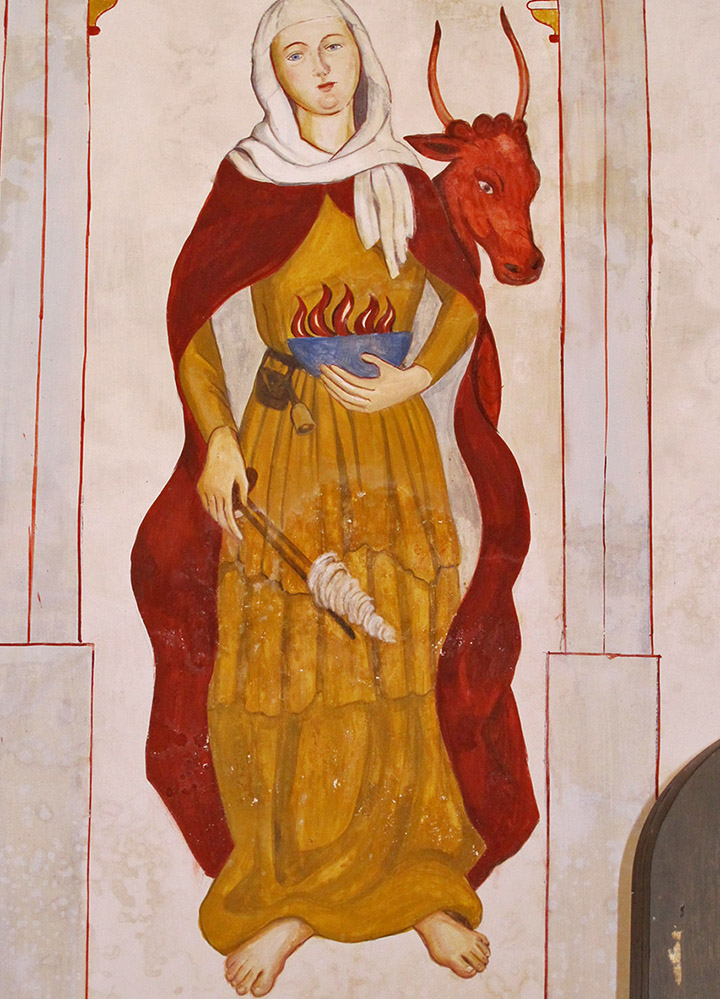
This painting depicts St. Brigid of Kildare on the right with a bowl of fire and a spindle, along with a cow.

== Association with Saint Patrick ==
It is claimed that Saint Patrick was buried within the Abbey grounds next to the high altar, which has led to many believing this is why Glastonbury was popular among Irish pilgrims throughout the ages. This was recorded by William of Malmesbury in his document "De antiquitate Glastoniensis ecclesiae (Concerning the Antiquity of Glastonbury)" that was compiled between 1129–35, where it was noted that “After converting the Irish and establishing them solidly in the Catholic faith he returned to his native land, and was led by guidance from on high to Glastonbury. There he came upon certain holy men living the life of hermits. Finding themselves all of one mind with Patrick they decided to form a community and elected him as their superior. Later, two of their members resided on the Tor to serve its Chapel.” The well known Irish Scholar James Carney also elaborated on this claim and wrote: “it is possible that Patrick, tired and ill at the end of his arduous mission felt released from his vow not to leave Ireland, and returned to the monastery from which he had come, which might have been Glastonbury.”

== Construction and renovation ==
The chapel was built by Abbot Richard Bere who was well known for being a master builder in his time. Construction started in 1512 and was finished five years later. It originally sat next to St. Patrick's Almshouses for women, which were demolished during the Suppression of the Monasteries along with most of Glastonbury Abbey around 1539 after the execution of the last Abbot, Richard Whiting. From '2009–2010' the Chapel was renovated 'with a new stained glass window by Wayne Ricketts and murals designed by Fleur Kelly, a local artist. This was made possible by a grant of £49,200 by the Heritage Lottery Fund.' Its construction is described as 'Simple Perp chapel of random rubble with pantile roof.' Complete with a 'Bellcote with single bell to west gable.' It has 'Panels with carved arms of the Abbey and Tudor roses at west end. 4-light traceried east window.' And a 'South window with original glass.'
