= Apomyelois cognata =

Scientific classification
- Kingdom: Animalia
- Phylum: Arthropoda
- Class: Insecta
- Order: Lepidoptera
- Family: Pyralidae
- Genus: Apomyelois
- Species: A. cognata

Binomial name
- Apomyelois cognata (Staudinger, 1871)

Synonyms
- Myelois cognata Staudinger, 1871; Apomyelois schaeuffelella Amsel, 1959

Species of snout moth

Apomyelois cognata is a species of snout moth in the genus Apomyelois. It was described by Staudinger in 1871, originally in genus Myelois.

== Distribution ==
The species is known to occur in Russia. An old and unconfirmed record exists for Cyprus. Apomyelois schaeuffelella, described in 1959 by Hans Georg Amsel and considered a junior synonym of Apomyelois cognata, was described from Iran.

== Description ==
Adults of the species resemble those of Apomyelois bistriatella, (Note: a more widely distributed species in the same genus, with a range that overlaps with A. cognata in the Southern Ural) but are larger, have broader forewings of which the markings are more contrasting than in A. bistriatella, and show some genital differences. The wing pattern and colouring is slightly variable. The wingspan is 20–23 mm.
