= Ballynafagh Lake =

Ecological site in County Kildare, Ireland

- Loch Bhaile na Faiche
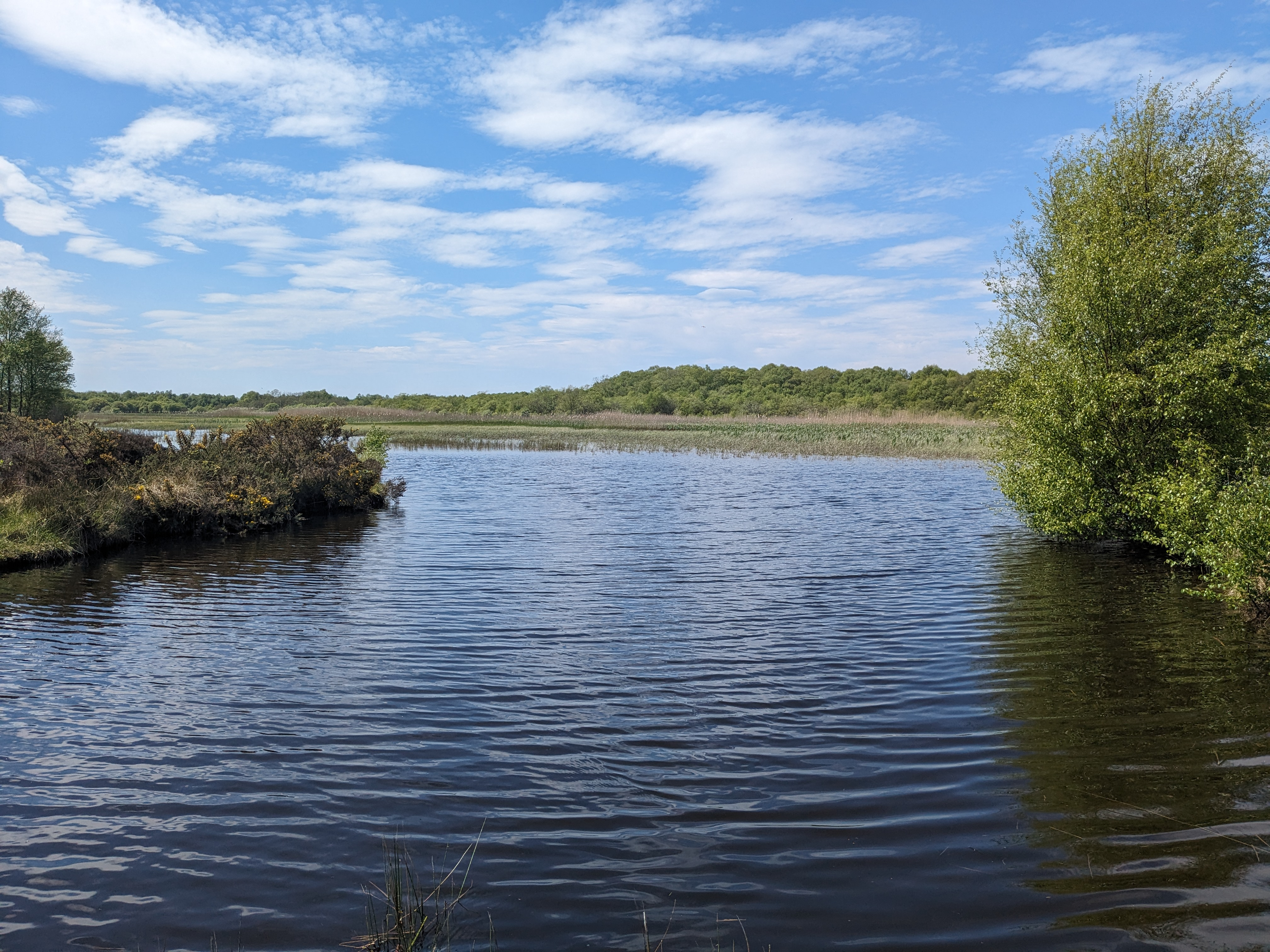

- Location within Ireland
- Location: County Kildare, Ireland
- Nearest city: Prosperous
- Coordinates: 53°17′59″N 6°47′29″W
- Area: 45.49 hectares (112.4 acres)
- Governing body: National Parks and Wildlife Service

Ballynafagh Lake (Irish: Loch Bhaile na Faiche) is a Special Area of Conservation and wildfowl sanctuary in County Kildare, Ireland, near the town of Prosperous. This site is also known as the Blackwood Reservoir, the Blackwood Lake or the Prosperous Reservoir.

== Location ==
The Ballynafagh Lake Special Area of Conservation is located in the townlands of Ballynafagh, Blackwood, Coolree, Garvoge, Graigues and Moods, approximately 2 km north of the town of Prosperous.

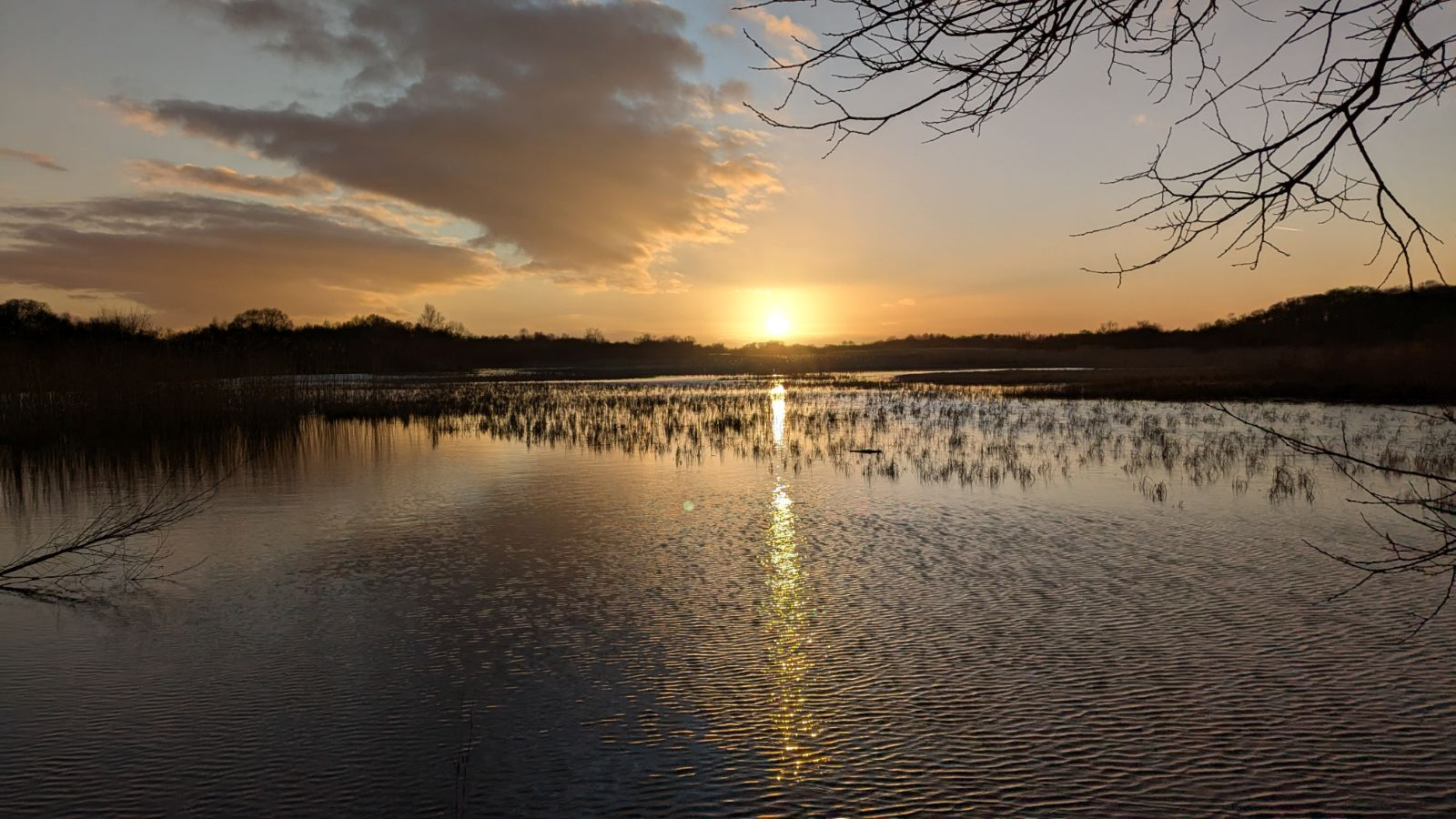
Lake at sunset

== Special Area of Conservation: qualifying interests ==
Ballynafagh Lake is of significant ecological interest as a Special Area of Conservation. Under the European Union Habitats Directive 92/43/EEC and the Irish regulations which implement this Directive (European Communities (Birds and Natural Habitats) Regulations 2011 (S.I. No. 477 of 2011), Ireland has a legal obligation to designate habitats and plant and animal species for conservation. To 2024, Ireland has designated approximately 13,500 km^{2}, between terrestrial, freshwater and marine habitats. The lake itself is not a natural feature. The Natura 2000 information for the site describes it thus:

”The site comprises a former reservoir (generally called Ballynafagh Lake) and an associated canal feeder (Blackwood feeder), the latter now disused and mostly dry. The lake is shallow and is now very overgrown with various wetland vegetation types with only a small area of open water remaining. Fen is the predominant habitat, with reed-swamp, wet grassland and some bog or heath also occurring. A strip of deciduous woodland occurs on some drier ground. The main habitats along the canal feeder are dry grassland (partly improved), wet grassland, swamp vegetation and scrub.”

The lake itself is described as “a shallow alkaline lake with some emergent vegetation. The Blackwood Feeder, which connects Ballynafagh Lake to the Grand Canal, is also included in the site.” There are some calcareous springs, some of which are tufa-forming, at the site, mainly in the north-east of the site.

This site had been recognised as of significance and worthy of conservation in the latter half of the 20th century. In 1972, Roger Goodwillie, of An Foras Forbartha, noted that consideration should be given to passing a Conservation Order on Ballynafagh Lake (also called the Prosperous Reservoir), in order to protect the relatively high numbers of breeding birds from disturbance. The lake was rated at that time as of local importance (criteria: only area of its type in county/one of a few localities in province/ fine example of its kind/general educational importance) and priority level B (relative urgency necessary for protection of these areas, on a A-C scale). The site is noted in An Foras Forbartha's 1981 text "Areas of scientific interest in Ireland: national heritage inventory" as being of ecological interest as a wildfowl feeding and breeding site, including several species not found elsewhere in the country. Ballynafagh lake was proposed as a Site of Community Importance (SCI) in August 2000 and designated as a Special Area of Conservation in November 2018.

Ballynafagh Lake qualifies for Special Area of Conservation status under three qualifying features, one based on habitat conservation and two based on species conservation. These features are:

- Alkaline fens (Natura 2000 code 7230)
- Desmoulin's Whorl Snail (Vertigo moulinsiana; Natura 2000 code 1016)
- Marsh Fritillary butterfly (Euphydryas aurinia; Natura 2000 code 1065)

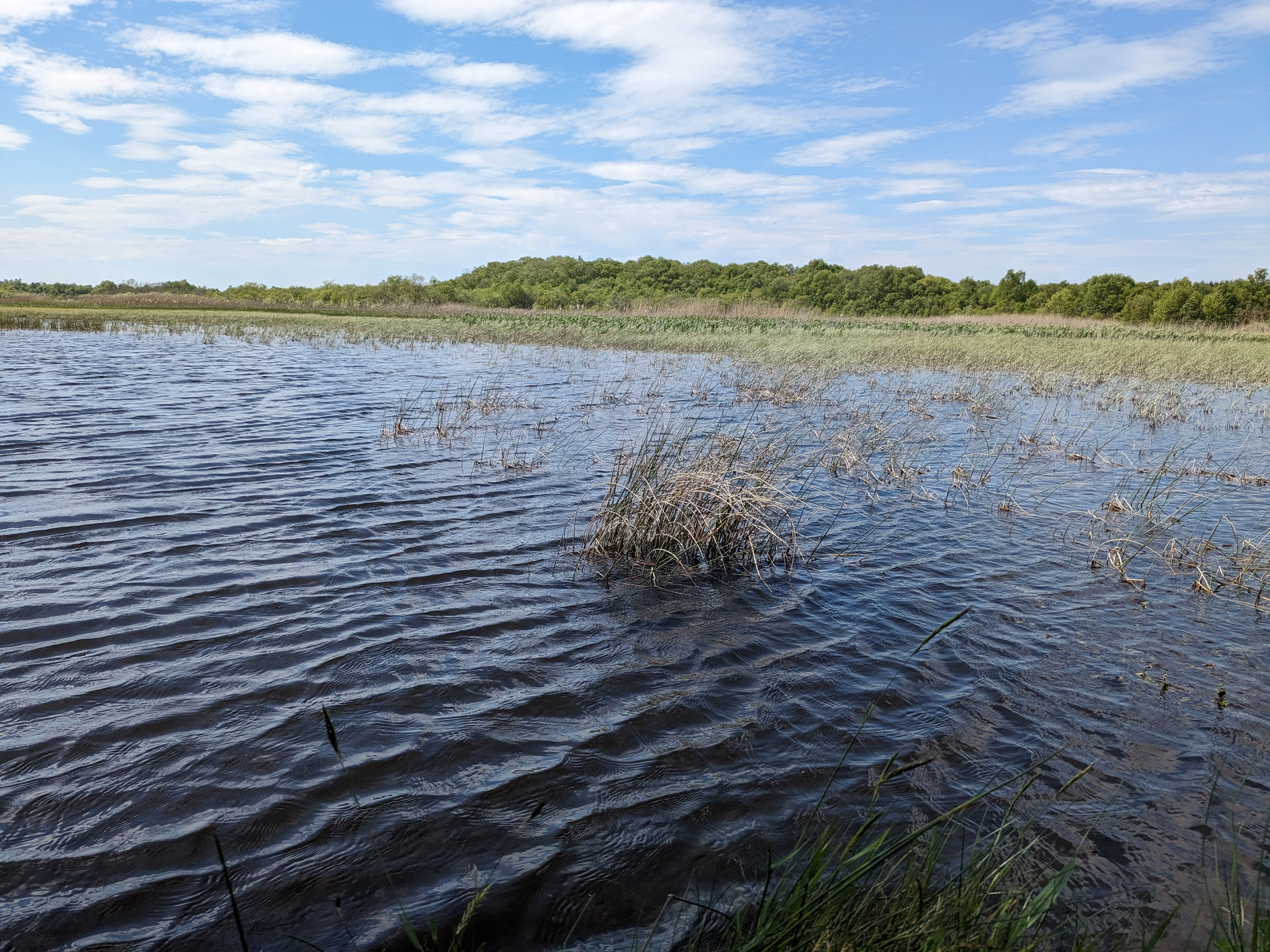
Ballynafagh Lake

=== Alkaline fens ===
Alkaline fens are permanently waterlogged peat wetlands, which have an alkaline (non-rainfall) supply of water. They are highly specialised ecosystems with characteristic flora, and are considered Annex I habitats under the European Union Habitats Directive. The European Environmental Agency's EUNIS description of alkaline fens describes the alkaline fens habitat as:

“Wetlands mostly or largely occupied by peat- or tufa-producing small sedge and brown moss communities developed on soils permanently waterlogged, with a soligenous or topogenous base-rich, often calcareous water supply, and with the water table at, or slightly above or below, the substratum.”

The Irish Office of Public Works report of 2009 noted that at the time of publication, Ireland had 19,621 hectares of fen land in 342 sites, of which 763 hectares is conserved. There were at that time 39 Special Areas of Conservation (SAC) sites which included alkaline fens as a qualification for conservation. This report noted that in the Republic of Ireland, there had been a 79% loss of fen habitat, with the causes listed as land reclamation, drainage, development and infilling. The National Parks & Wildlife Service (NPWS) Foss review of 2007 found that there were 380 alkaline fens in Ireland.

The Foss Report notes that there are a range of classification systems for fens. The EU Habitats Directive Annex I Alkaline fen habitat typically corresponds to the Heritage Council “rich fen” habitat. According to the NPWS site synopsis, Ballynafagh Lake is a shallow alkaline lake, surrounded by acid grassland, heath and bog. There are patches of emergent vegetation in the middle and at the shore of the lake. At the surface of the lake can be found common duckweed (Lemna minor) and liverwort Riccocarpus natans. Submerged flora include starworts (Callitriche spp.) and lesser bladderwort (Utricularia minor). At the edge of the lake, vegetation typical of alkaline fens can be found. This includes blunt-flowered rush (Juncus subnodulosus), black bog-rush (Schoenus nigricans) and species of sedge, such as Carex lepidocarpa and Carex rostrata. Other plant species to be found here include bulrush (Typha latifolia), marsh arrowgrass (Triglochin palustris), marsh-marigold (Caltha palustris), marsh lousewort (Pedicularis palustris) and water mint (Mentha aquatica). In the open water of the lake, stands of common reed (Phragmites australis), bulrush and bottle sedge (Carex rostrata) grow. To the western corner of the lake, a stand of great fen-sedge (Cladium mariscus) can be found.

While only one habitat is noted as a qualifying interesting for SAC status, the Natura 2000 and European Environmental Agency EUNIS webpages for the Ballynafagh Lake site also note that a second habitat of conservation interest occurs at this site, that is, Transition mires and quaking bogs (Natura 2000 code 7140). This habitat consists of 2.69 hectares of transition mire cover. Transition mires and quaking bogs are very wet mires which can be considered intermediate between rich or poor fens and bog habitats, with surface pH varying between distinctly acidic to slightly basic. Acid grassland, heath and bog occur around the lake. The flora in this habitat includes common bent (Agrostis capillaris), bog-myrtle (Myrica gale), bracken (Pteridium aquilinum), gorse (Ulex europaeus), heather (Calluna vulgaris) and purple moor-grass (Molinia caerulea). To the north-west of the lake, wet woodland of alder (Alnus glutinosa), birch (Betula spp.), and willow (Salix spp.).

=== Desmoulin's whorl snail ===
The Ballynafagh Lake SAC is of conservation interest for a number of species, two of which are Annex II species. A population of the rare snail species, Desmoulin's whorl snail (Vertigo moulinsiana; Natura 2000 code 1016), occurs at the Blackwood Feeder (the channel that connects Ballynafagh Lake to the Grand Canal) and in wetland flora beside the lake. This species requires tall vegetation and stable hydrology. It has ‘Endangered’ status in Ireland and ‘Vulnerable’ status in Europe.

Wetland drainage has resulted in the decline of this species in Europe, and in Ireland the drainage of wetlands and the management of the banks and wetlands of the Grand and Royal Canal have removed the habitat it requires. The 2019 report by Long and Brophy notes that drying out, vegetation change and heavy overgrazing are risks to the Desmoulin's whorl snail population at Ballynafagh Bog, beside Ballynafagh Lake. Monitoring of the site for population and habitat showed a decline in the species, from status Green (Favourable) in 2007-2012 to status Red (Unfavourable) in 2013-2018. The assessment for future prospects for the species showed a decrease from status Green in 2007-2012 to Status Amber (Unfavourable-Inadequate) in 2013-2018. The report recommended an overall hydrological plan to increase/maintain water levels at the site, targeted scrub removal and a reduction in grazing at the Blackwater Feeder, to improve the status of the species at Ballynafagh.

The NPWS site synopsis notes that another rare mollusc species occurs at this site. This is Pisidium pseudosphaerium, a members of the pea-clam family. The site synopsis states that this species has only been recorded from sites along the Royal Canal and the NPWS species record appears to confirm this pattern. The species status in Ireland is ‘Endangered’.

=== Marsh fritillary butterfly ===
The third qualifying feature for which Ballynafagh Lake is designated a Special Area of Conservation is the presence of the marsh fritillary butterfly, an Annex II Habitats Directive species, at the site. This species also is under protection via the Berne Convention on the Conservation of European Wildlife and Natural Habitats as an Annex II strictly protected species, and mentioned as an Annex I species under the 2011 revised Berne Convention listing the species requiring specific habitat conservation measures. It is Ireland's only protected insect and its status is ‘Vulnerable’, indicating that it is at risk of extinction. Ballynafagh Lake is designated as one of the 16 conservation sites for this species in Ireland. This butterfly may currently not be recorded at this location, however, the site must legally be managed for conservation of the species.

=== Wildfowl ===
Ballynafagh Lake is an important ornithological site and the only national wildfowl sanctuary in County Kildare (wildfowl sanctuary code WFS-30). The designation as a wildfowl sanctuary indicates that shooting of game birds is not permitted at this site. The NPWS site synopsis notes that bird species known to breed at the lake include little grebe (Tachybaptus ruficollis), mallard (Anas platyrhynchos), moorhen (Gallinula chloropus), coot (Fulica atra), snipe (Gallinago gallinago) and water rail (Rallus aquaticus). Curlew (Numenius arquata), sedge warbler (Acrocephalus schoenobaenus), reed bunting (Emberiza schoeniclus), whitethroat (Sylvia communis), and the black-headed gull (Larus ridibundus) have been recorded at the site. Waterfowl known to winter at Ballynafagh Lake include whooper swan (Cygnus cygnus), teal (Anas crecca), mallard, golden plover (Pluvialis apricaria) and curlew.

The Birdwatch Ireland entry for Ballynafagh Lake notes that, in addition to the birds listed above, the site also hosts kingfisher (Alcedo atthis) and reed bunting (Emberiza schoeniclus). The European Environmental Agency EUNIS webpage for this SAC lists five Habitats Directive bird species protected at the site: teal, mallard, whooper swan, curlew, and lapwing (Vanellus vanellus).

=== Other species ===
Other species noted on the Natura 2000 form for Ballynfagh Lake include the moths Apomyelois bistriatella subcognata and Ectoedemia argyropeza, the ground beetle Chlaenius tristis, the rove beetle Philonthus corvinus and the Common Frog (Rana temporaria).

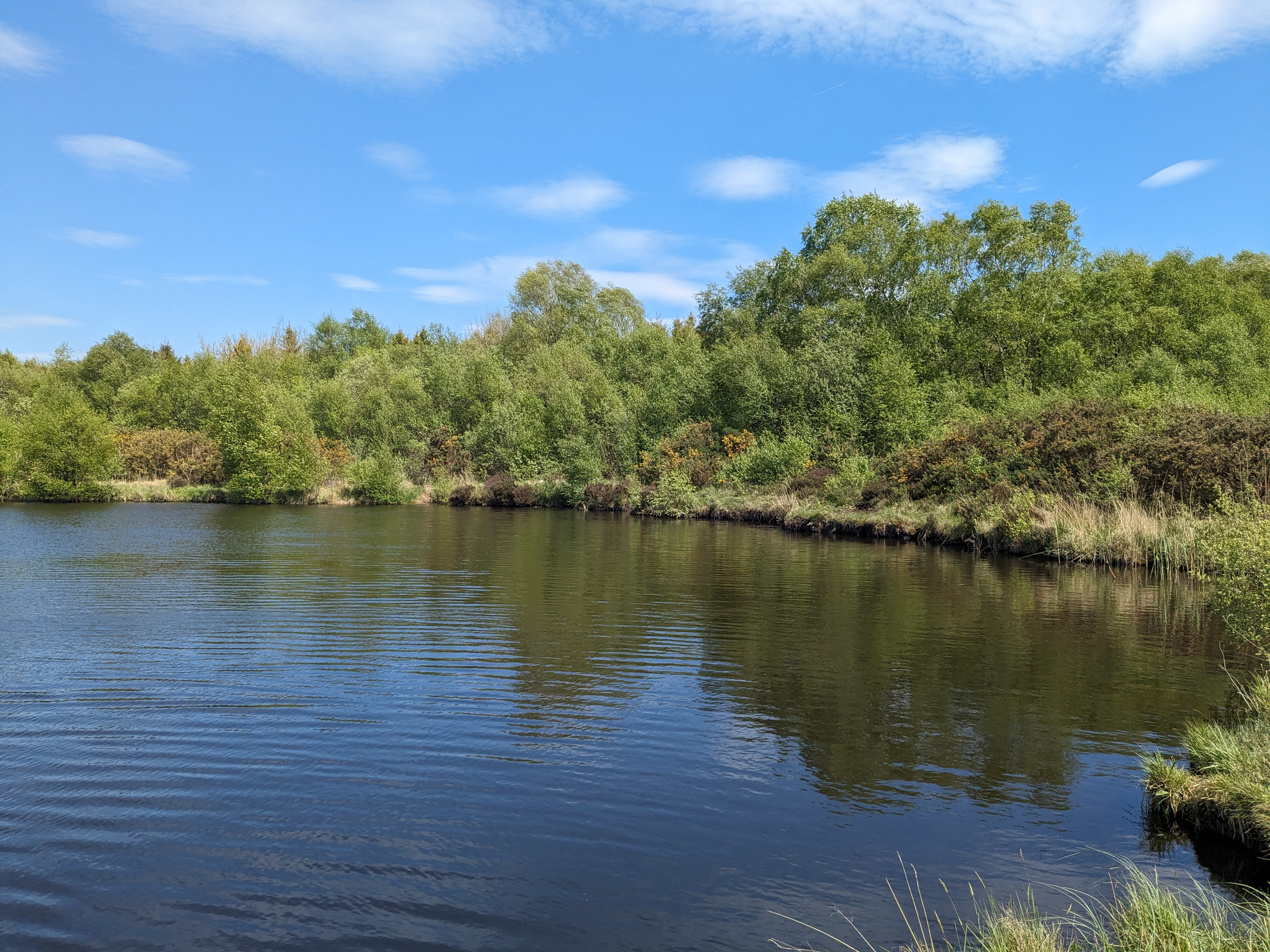
Ballynafagh Lake

== Conservation objectives ==
While there exists a management plan for nearby Ballynafagh Bog, no management plan has been developed to date for Ballynafagh Lake. The site-specific conservation objectives for the site were published in 2021. The overarching objectives are to restore the favourable conservation condition of the alkaline fens, to maintain the favourable conservation condition of Desmoulin's whorl snail (Vertigo moulinsiana) and to maintain the favourable conservation condition of marsh fritillary (Euphydryas aurinia) at Ballynafagh Lake Special Area of Conservation.

With regard to the alkaline fen, the conservation objectives include to maintain or increase the habitat area and distribution, to maintain the soil pH and nutrient status within natural ranges, and to maintain active peat formation where appropriate.Drainage conditions should be maintained or restored to natural or semi-natural conditions. Water quality should be maintained as appropriate for the site, especially pH and nutrient levels, to support the functioning of the site. The lake is partly ground-fed, with a calcium-rich water supply flows from the limestone under the lake. The vegetation should be maintained with respect to abundance of communities, cover of brown moss species, cover of vascular plant species. Levels of native negative indicator species (indicative of undesirable activities such as overgrazing, undergrazing, nutrient enrichment, agricultural improvement or impacts on hydrology) should be kept low. Non-native species should be maintained at a cover of less than 1%, and cover of scattered native trees and shrubs should be maintained at less than 10%.

With reference to indicators of local distinctiveness, the objectives state that there should be no decline in distribution or population sizes of rare, threatened or scarce species associated with the habitat; and that features of local distinctiveness should be maintained, subject to natural processes. Transitional areas between fens and other wetland habitats should be maintained and supported.

The distribution and occurrence of Desmoulin's whorl snail should be maintained, with no decline in record numbers or occurrences in number of occupied 1-kilometre monitored squares. The species is known to occur at the edge of the lake and along the length of the Blackwood feeder. The baseline size of the amount of habitat in at least sub-optimal condition for the site is 10 hectares. The area of suitable habitat should be maintained at 10 hectares or increased. The distribution of the marsh fritillary butterfly should be maintained, with maintenance of suitable habitat. The baseline figure for potential habitat for this species is taken as the approximately 2.5 hectares assessed as suitable and in good condition in 2012.

=== Conservation threats ===
Conservation threats to the presence of the Desmoulin snail are noted in the report by the Office of Public Works and by the 2019 report by Long and Brophy, which note that wetland drainage, clearance of the banks and wetlands of the Grand and Royal Canals and drying out, vegetation change and heavy overgrazing of the lands adjacent to the lake have affected the habitat quality.

== History ==
The branch of the Grand Canal to the Blackwood Reservoir was opened in 1780. It has a length of 3 miles or 60 chains. Use for commercial traffic ceased circa 1945 and the line was abandoned by 1952.

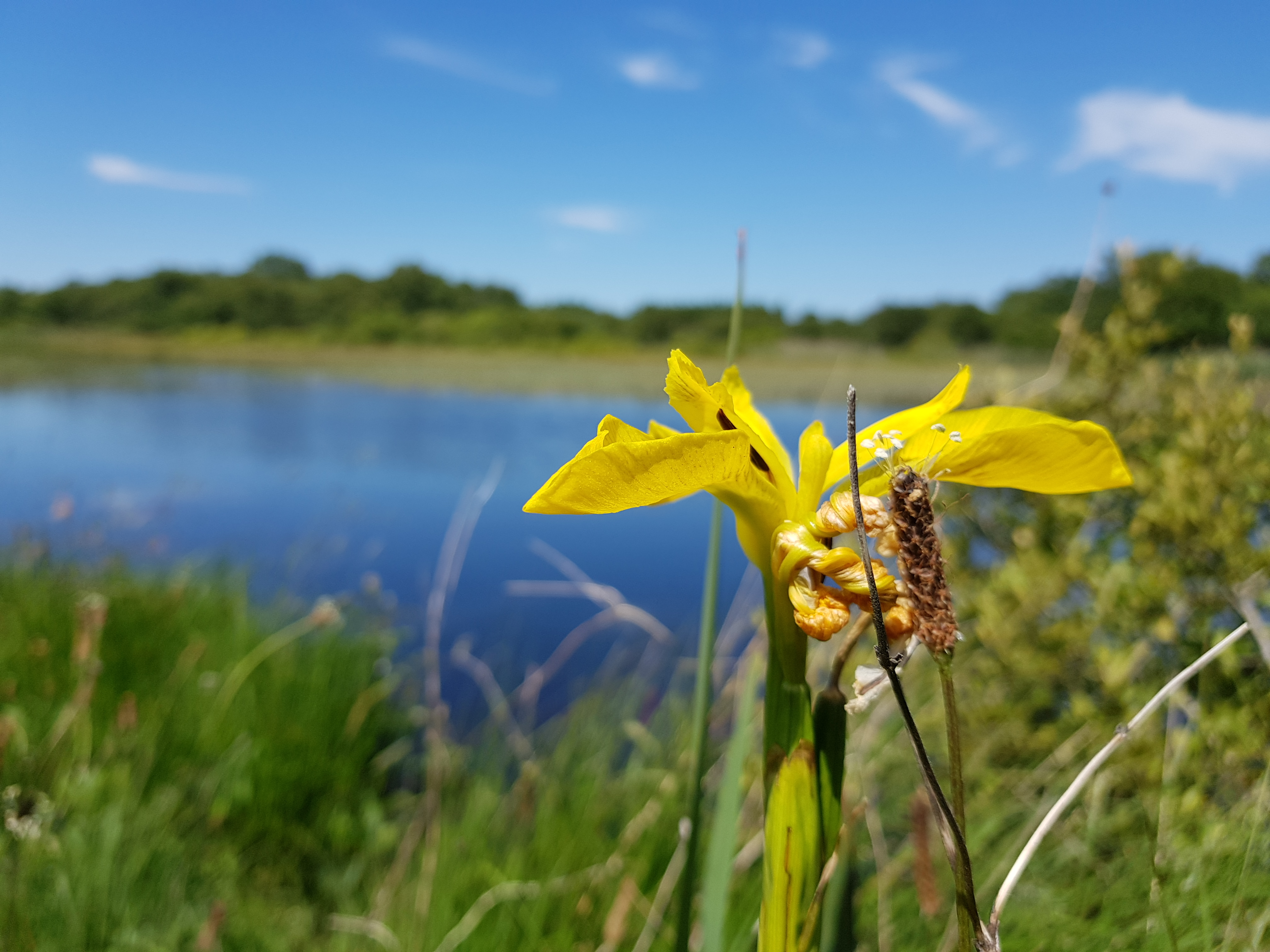
Yellow Iris, Iris pseudacorus

The Blackwood Reservoir, a reservoir of approximately 12 acres, was built by the Grand Canal Company to store water from the boglands to feed the Grand Canal. The origins of the Blackwood Feeder date from 1773, when Walter Hussey Burgh, who would later be Chief Baron of the Irish Exchequer, decided that a reservoir and associated cut should be opened between the Grand Canal at Mouds Bog and the Bog of Donore, in order "to help alleviate distress of the poor". The cut operated to feed water to the Grand Canal from the late 1700s to 1952. As well as supplying water to the canal, the Blackwood Feeder was used as a transport line, supplying turf and goods to Dublin from the surrounding areas. In 1952, ownership of the reservoir and feeder was handed over to Kildare County Council. The cost of maintenance of the facility and the available of an alternative source of water from the Irish Electricity Supply Board pumps at the Liffey Aqueduct likely reduced the cost-effectiveness of running the feeder and reservoir.

While the Blackwood Reservoir exists now as Ballynafagh Lake, the Blackwood Feeder does not exist as a waterway anymore as it has been drained. Much of it was filled in during the 1940s. However, some of the built heritage of the feeder still exists. The only original bridge over the feeder still in existence is Graigues Bridge. To one end of the lake, the remains of the old gate house or sluice-keeper's house (also known as Lynch's Lock House, named after the Lynch family who lived there and managed the sluices), which once controlled the flow of water from the reservoir to the Grand Canal, are still present. The culvert still runs under the remains of the house, however, the sluices themselves are no longer present.

During World War II, Ireland, lacking supplies from outside of coal or oil, commissioned a fleet of canal barges, called G-Boats to draw turf from the midland bogs of Ireland to the people of Dublin. These boats were built of timber and drawn by horses.

The artificial lake once had three named islets, which apparently no longer appear.

== Gallery ==
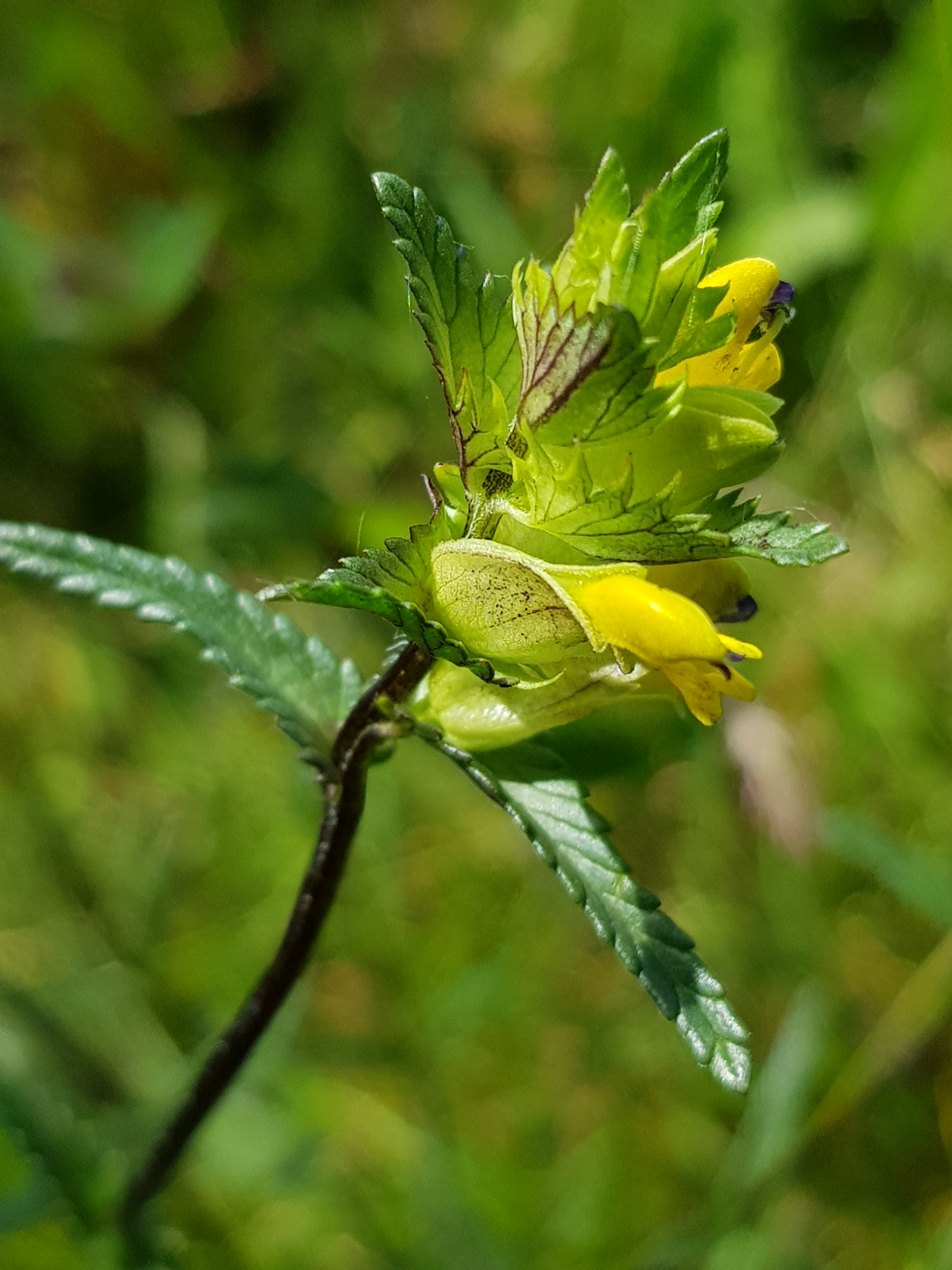
Yellow-rattle, Rhinanthus minor

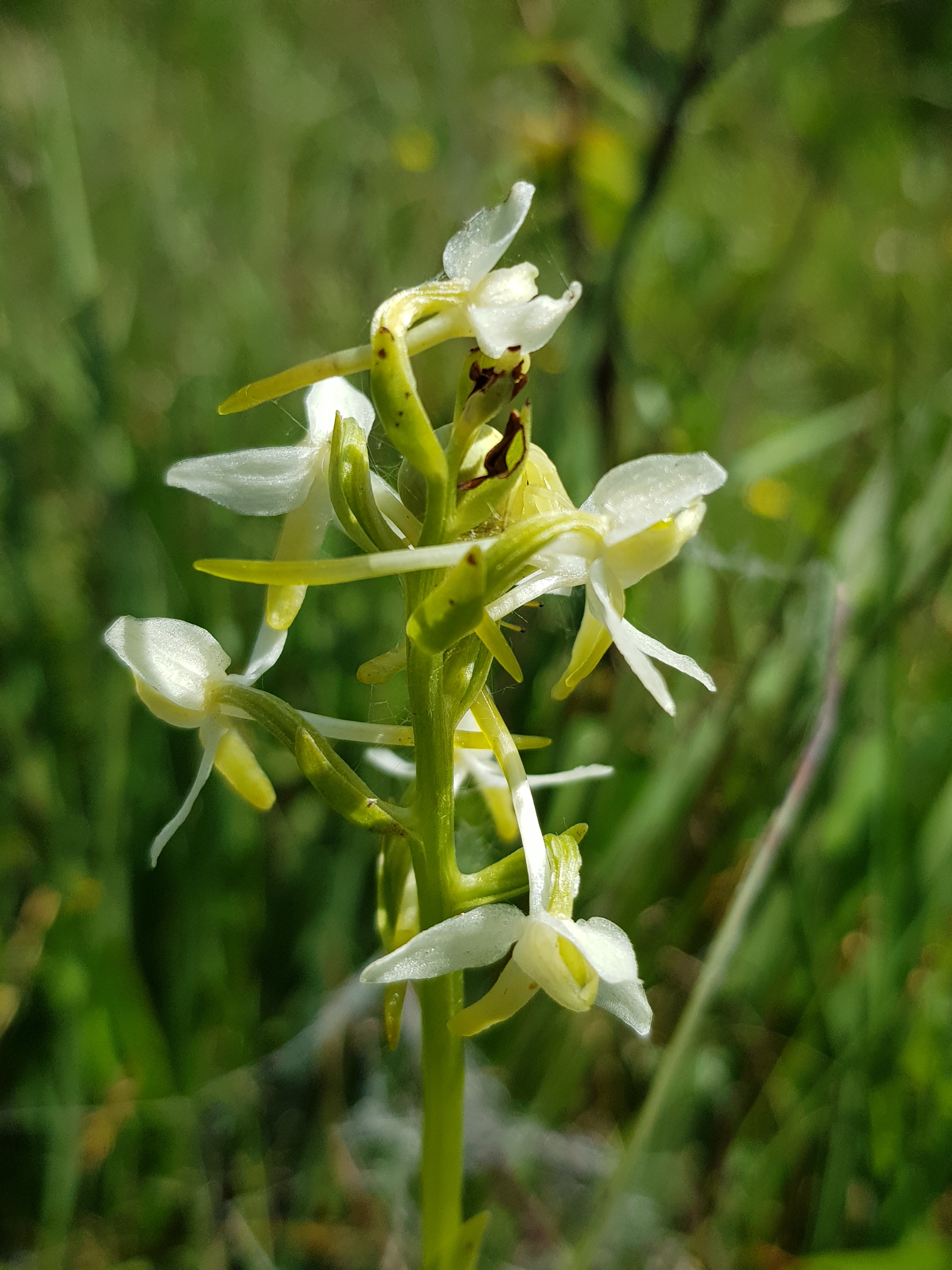
Lesser butterfly orchid, Platanthera bifolia

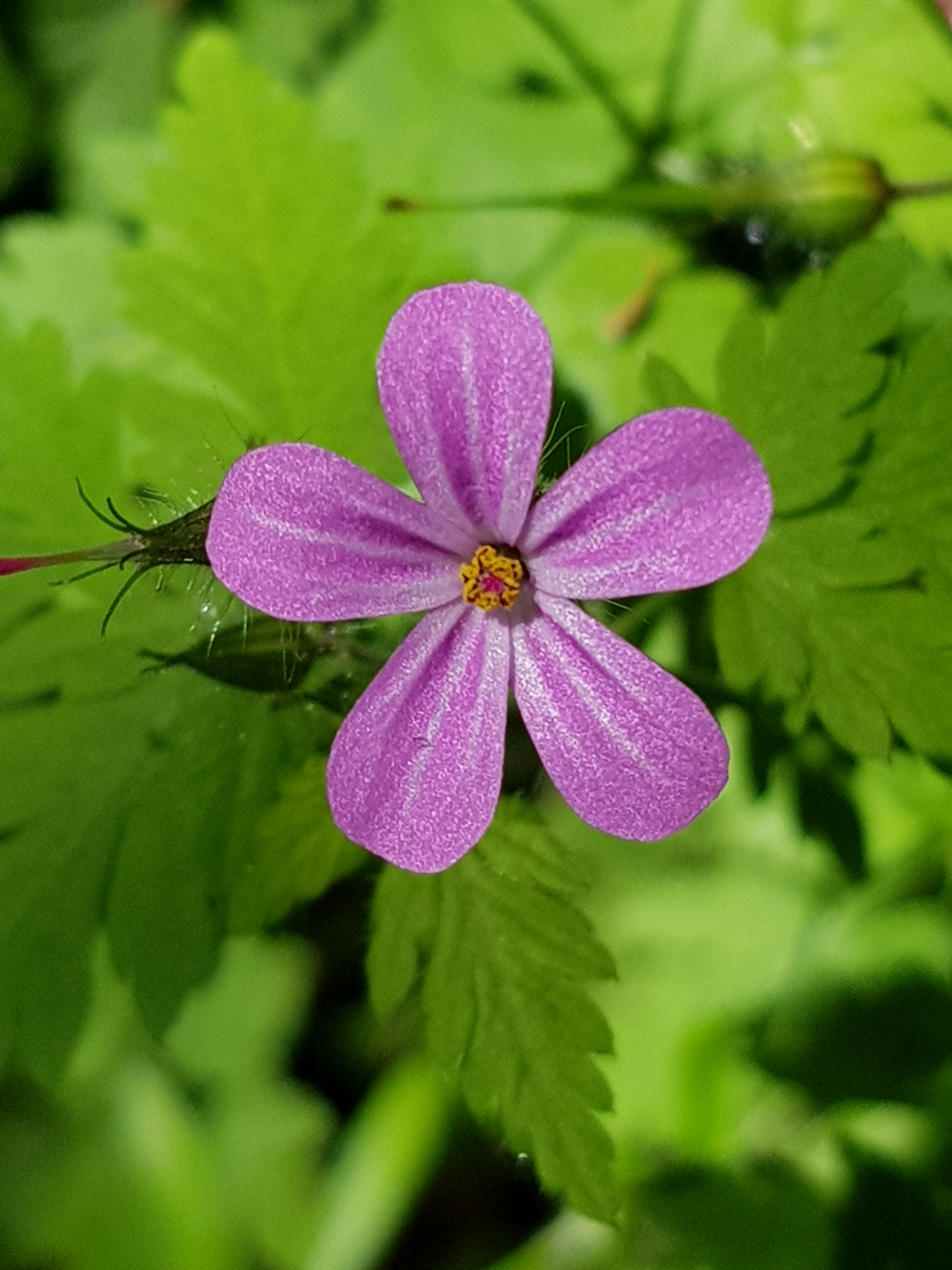
Herb-robert, Geranium robertianum

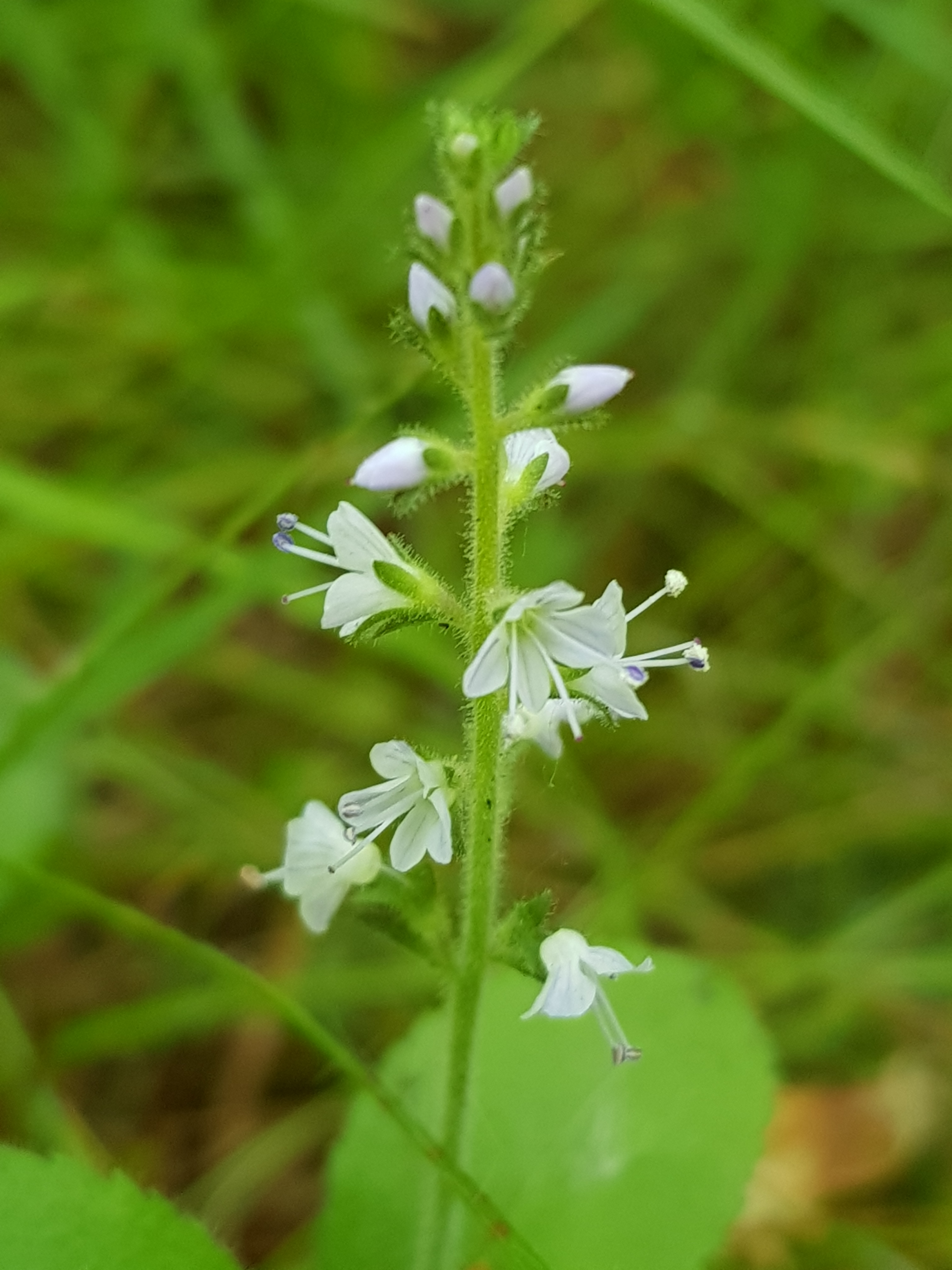
Heath speedwell, Veronica officinalis

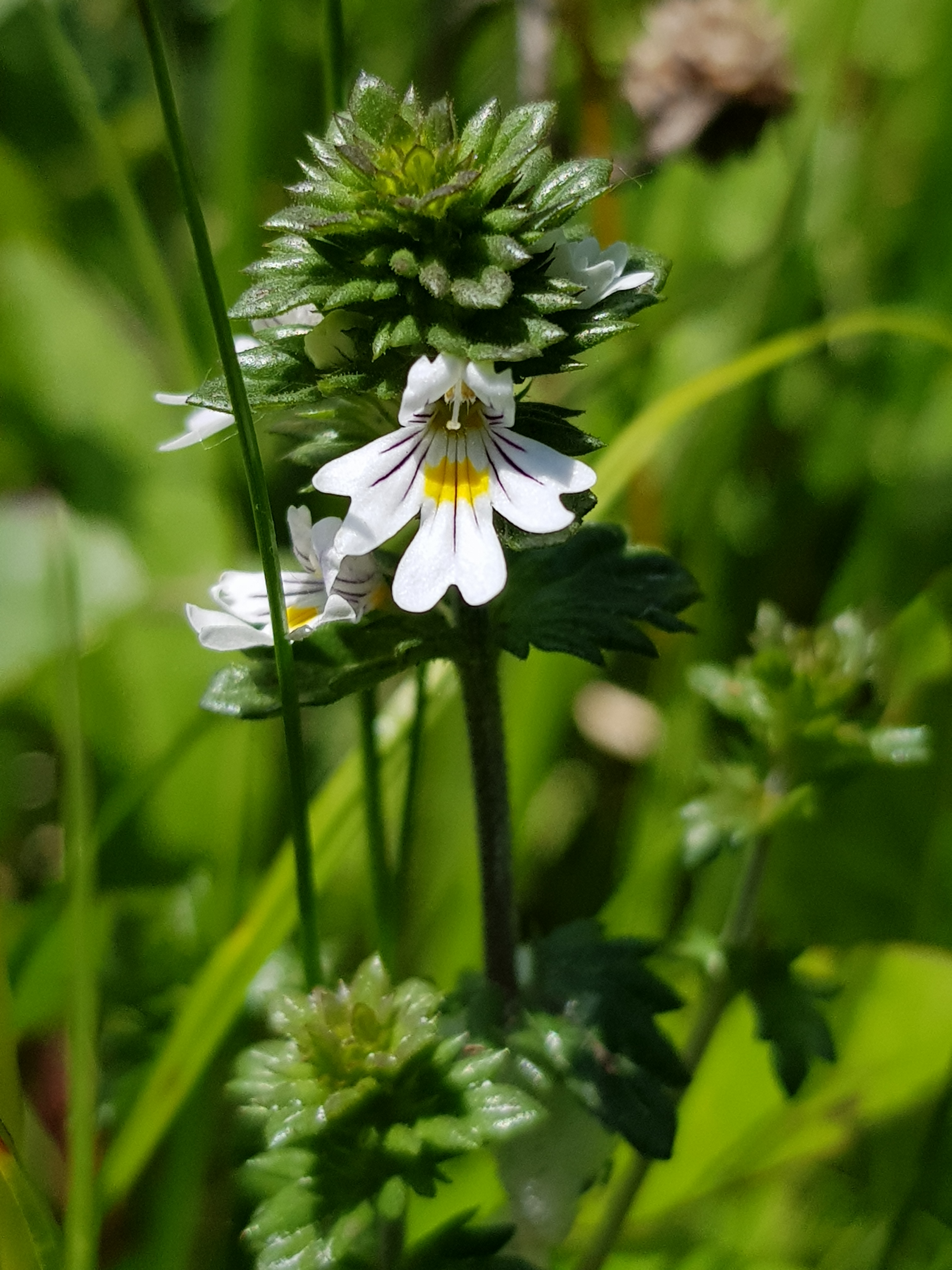
Eyebright, Euphasia officinalis agg.

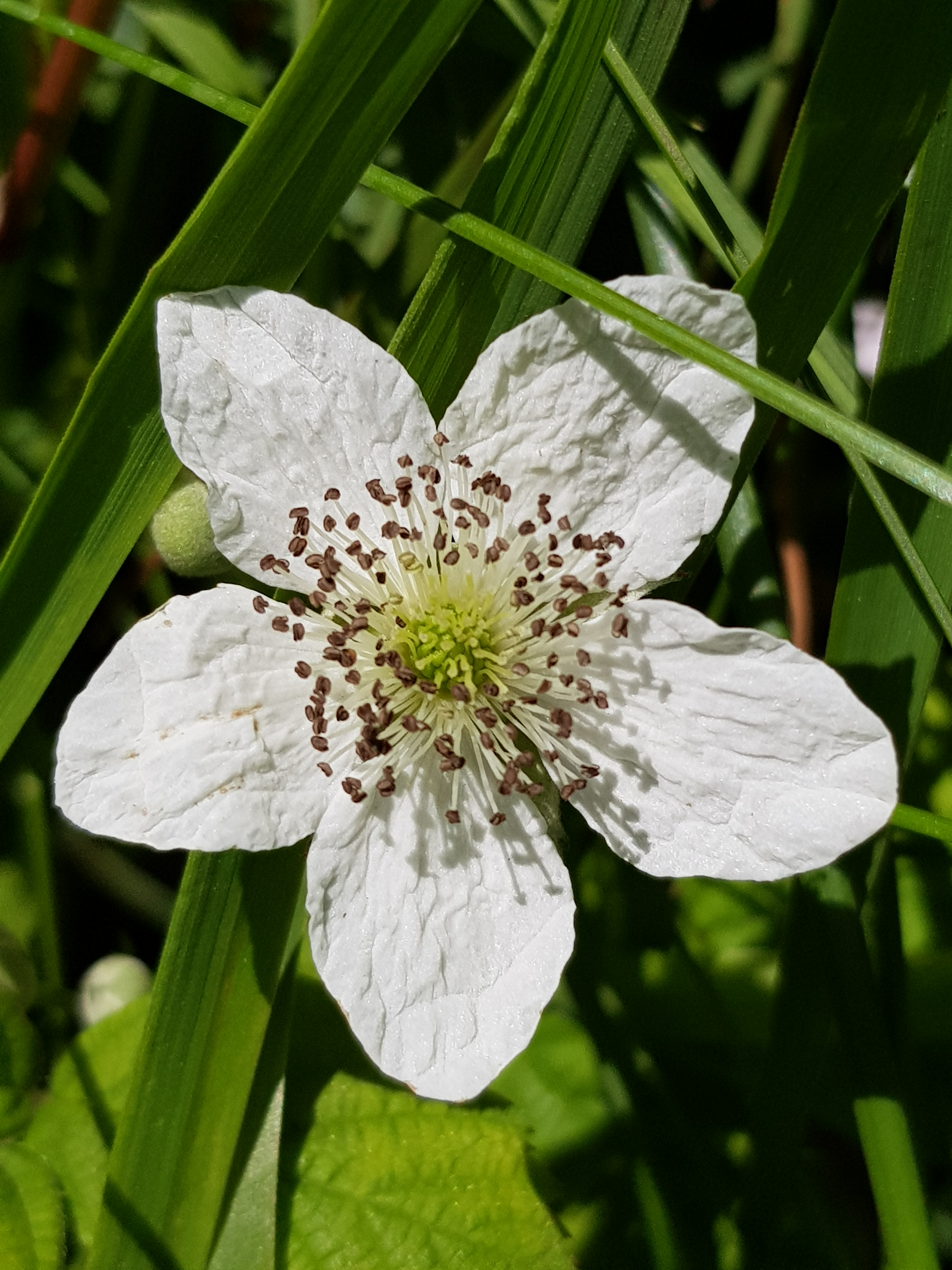
Rubus nemorosus in flower

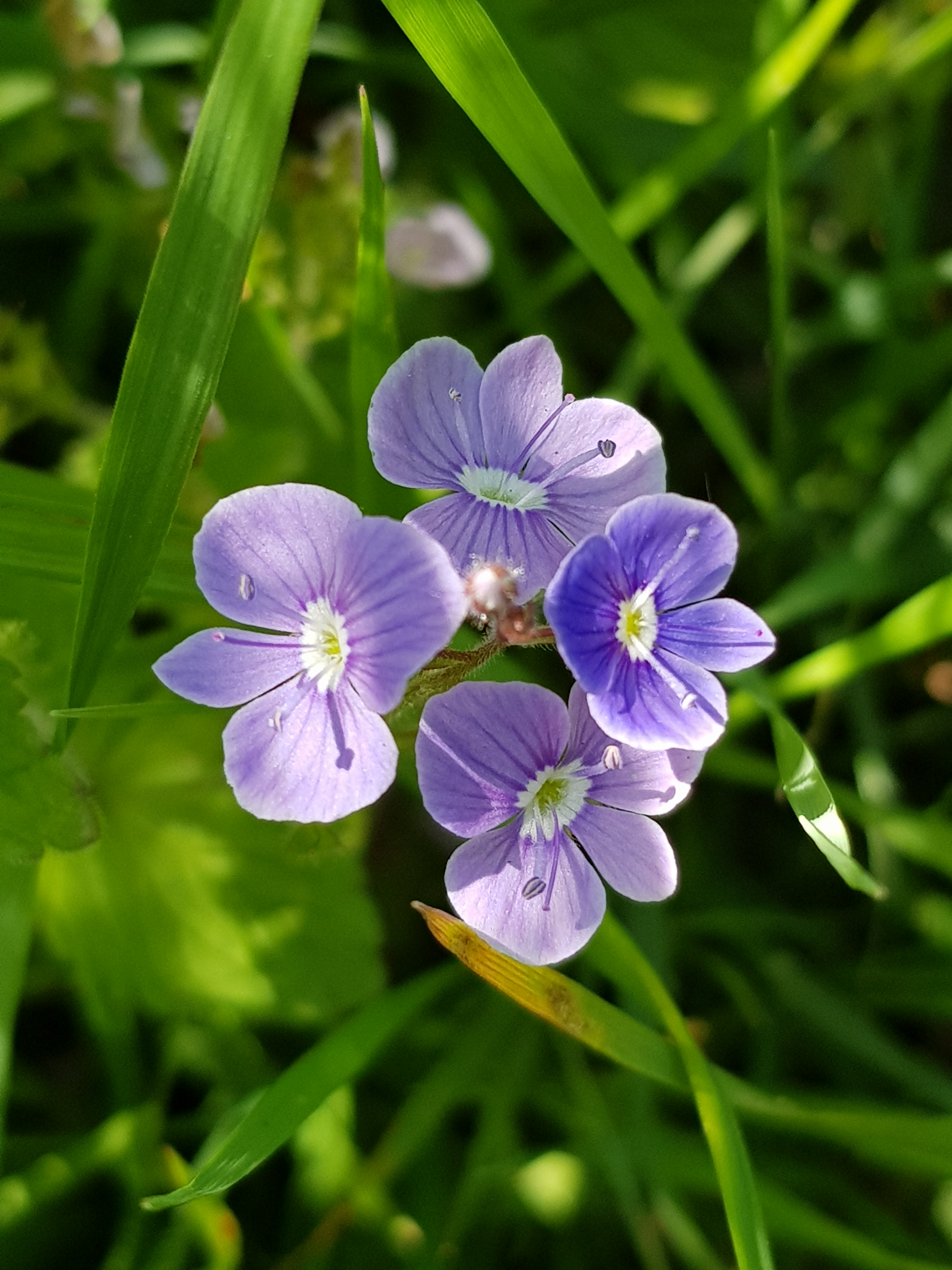
Speedwell; Veronica spp.

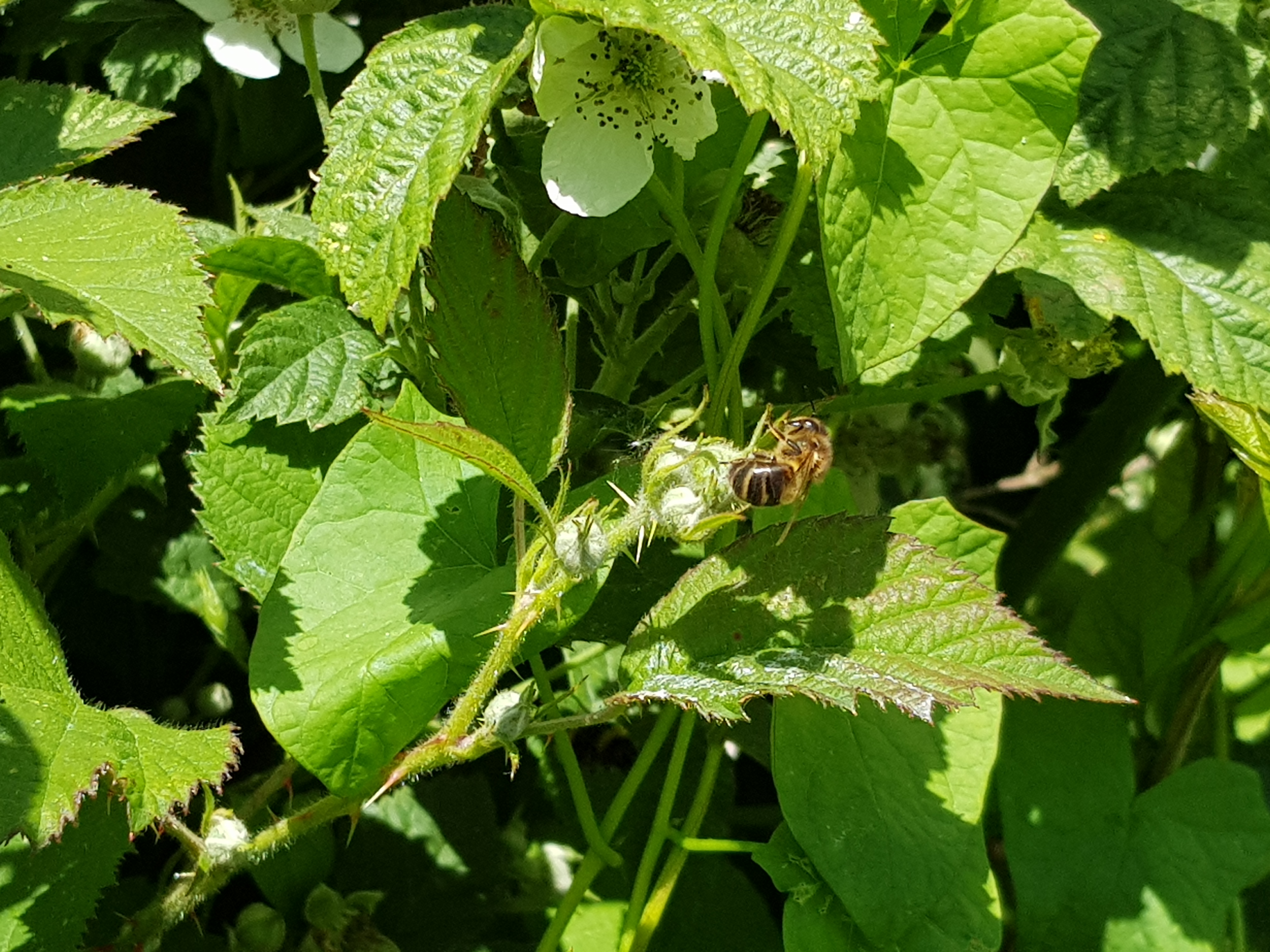
A honeybee Apis meillifera mellifera on a bramble Rubus nemorosus

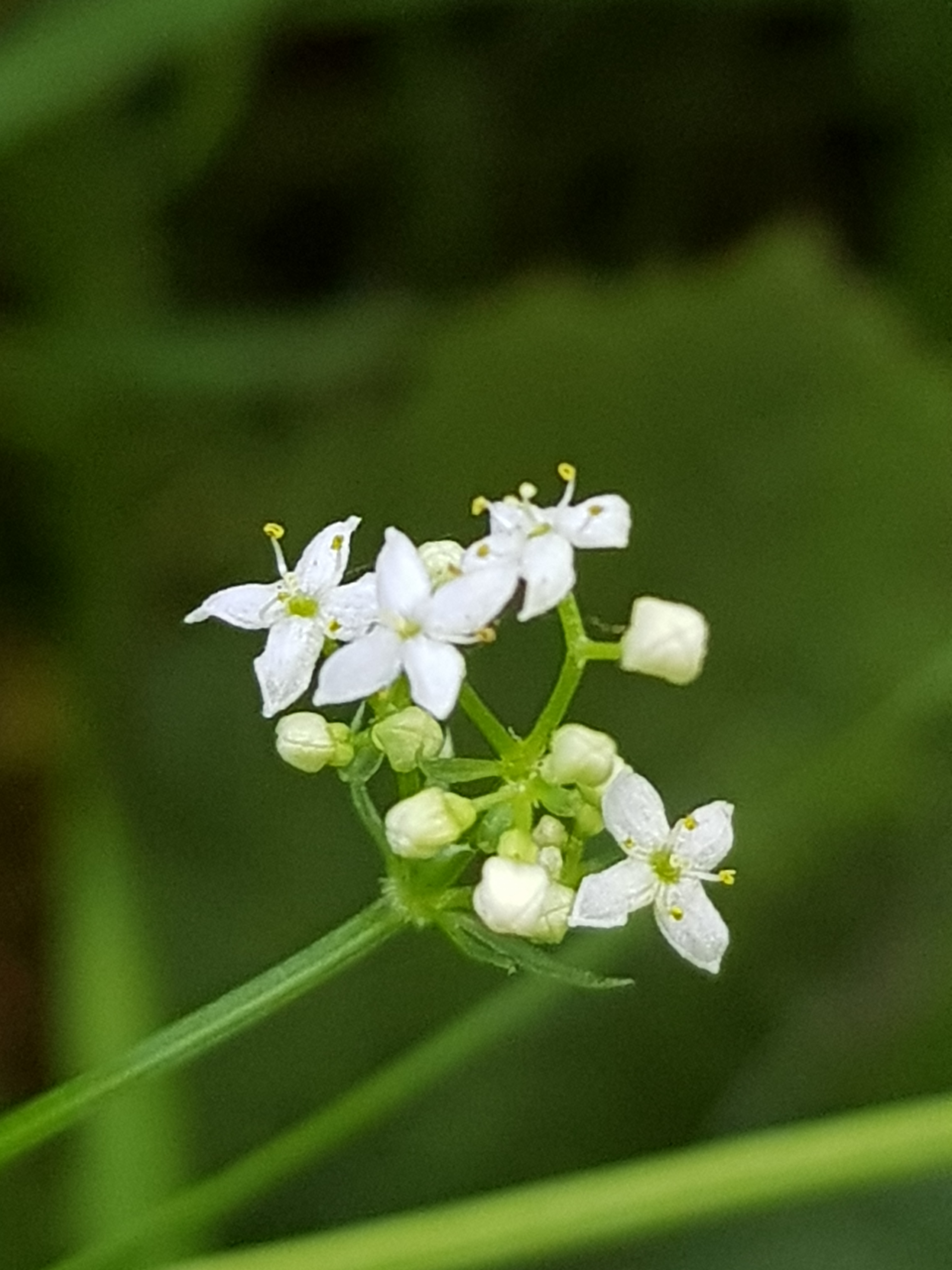
Common marsh bedstraw, Galium palustre

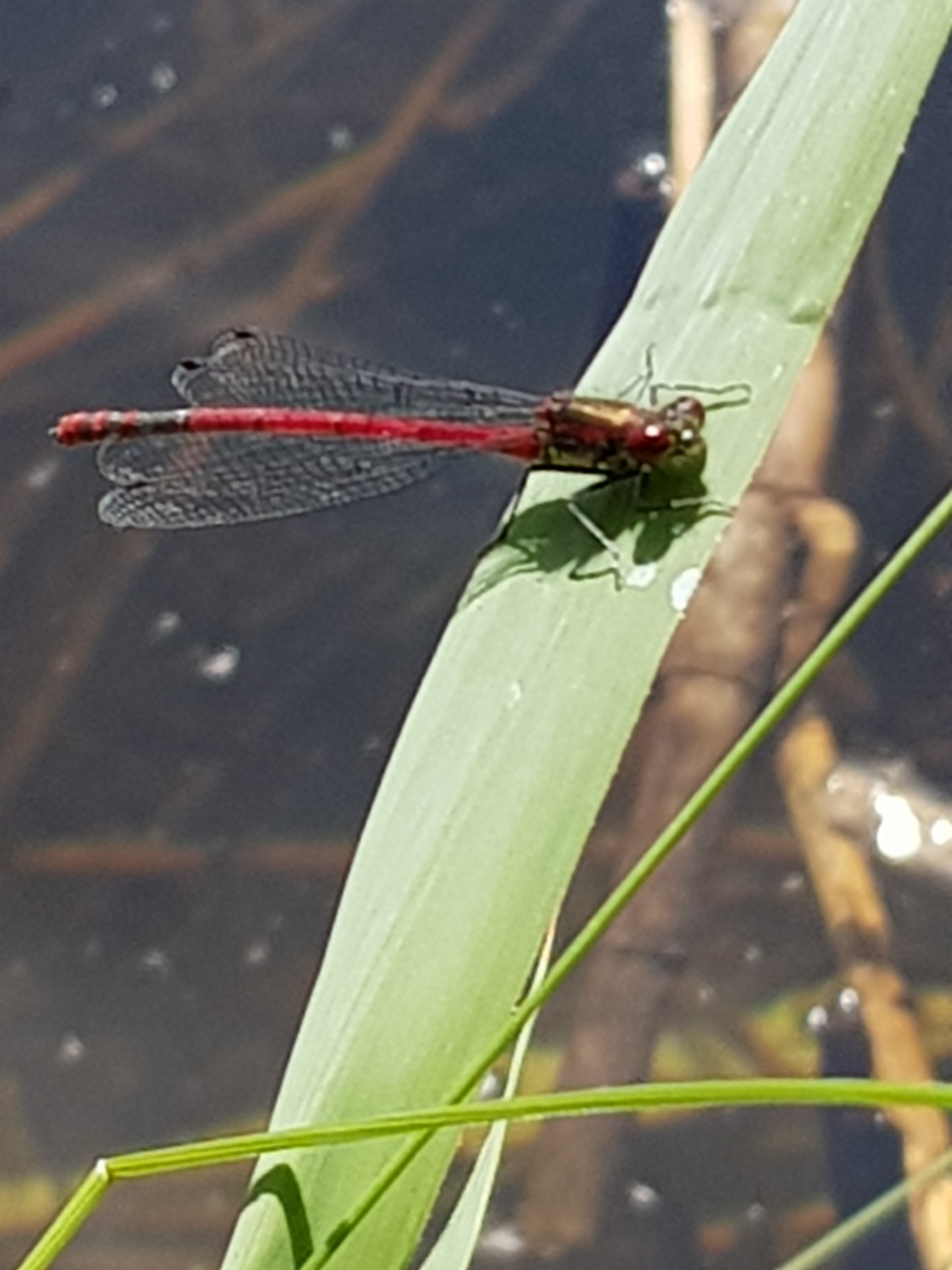
Large red damselfly, Pyrrhosoma nymphula

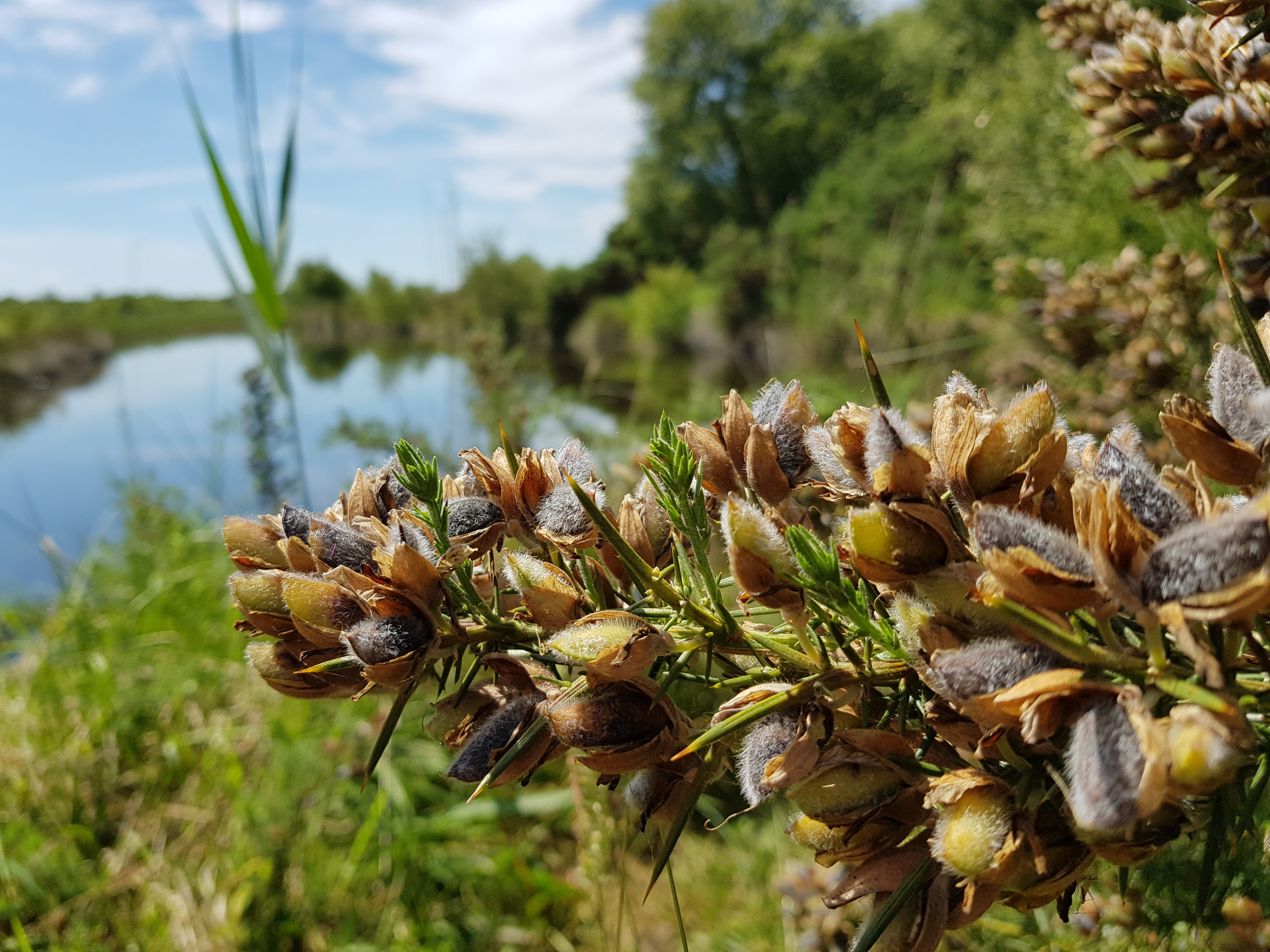
European gorse, Ulex europaeus

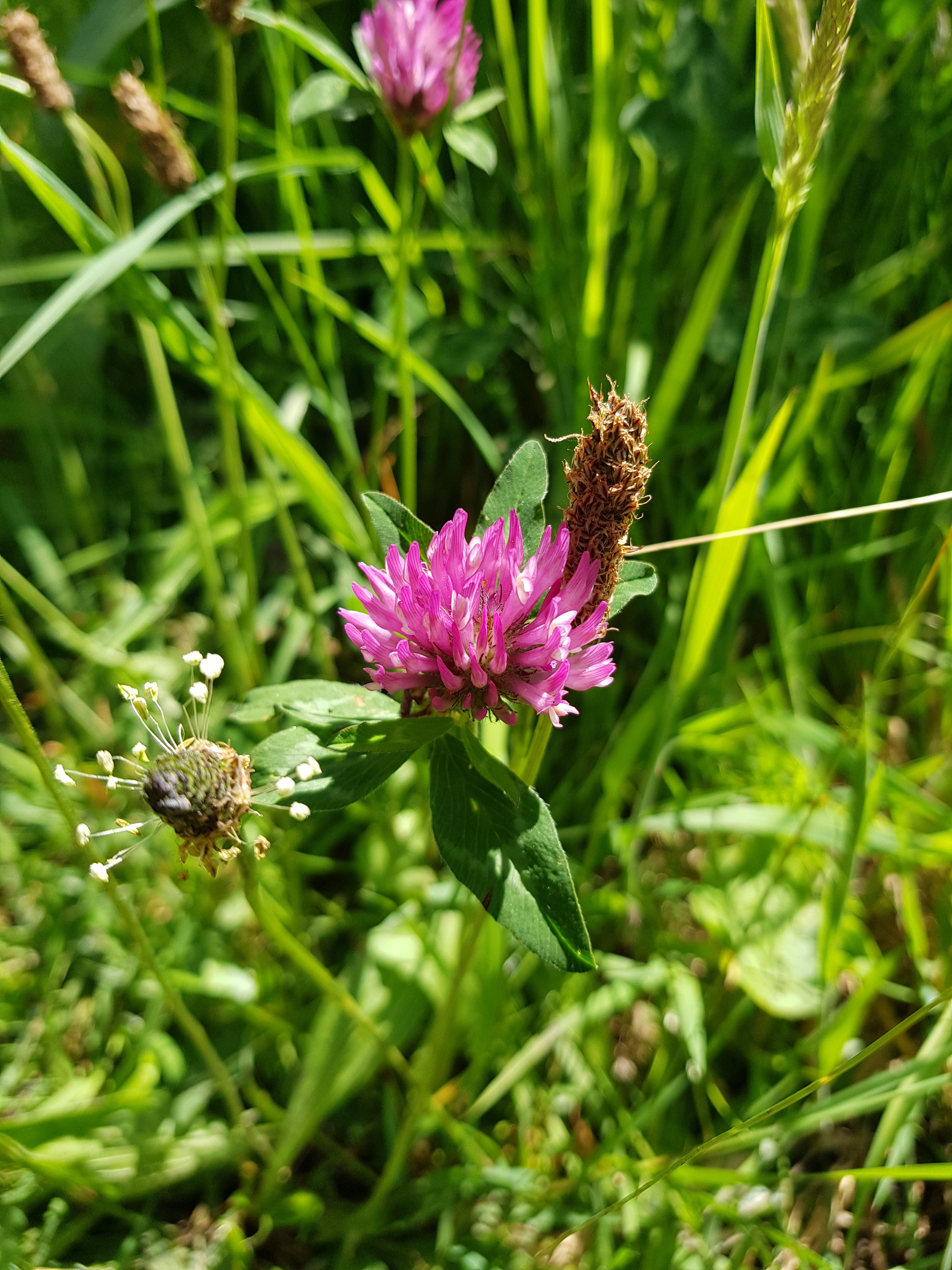
Red clover, Trifolium pratense

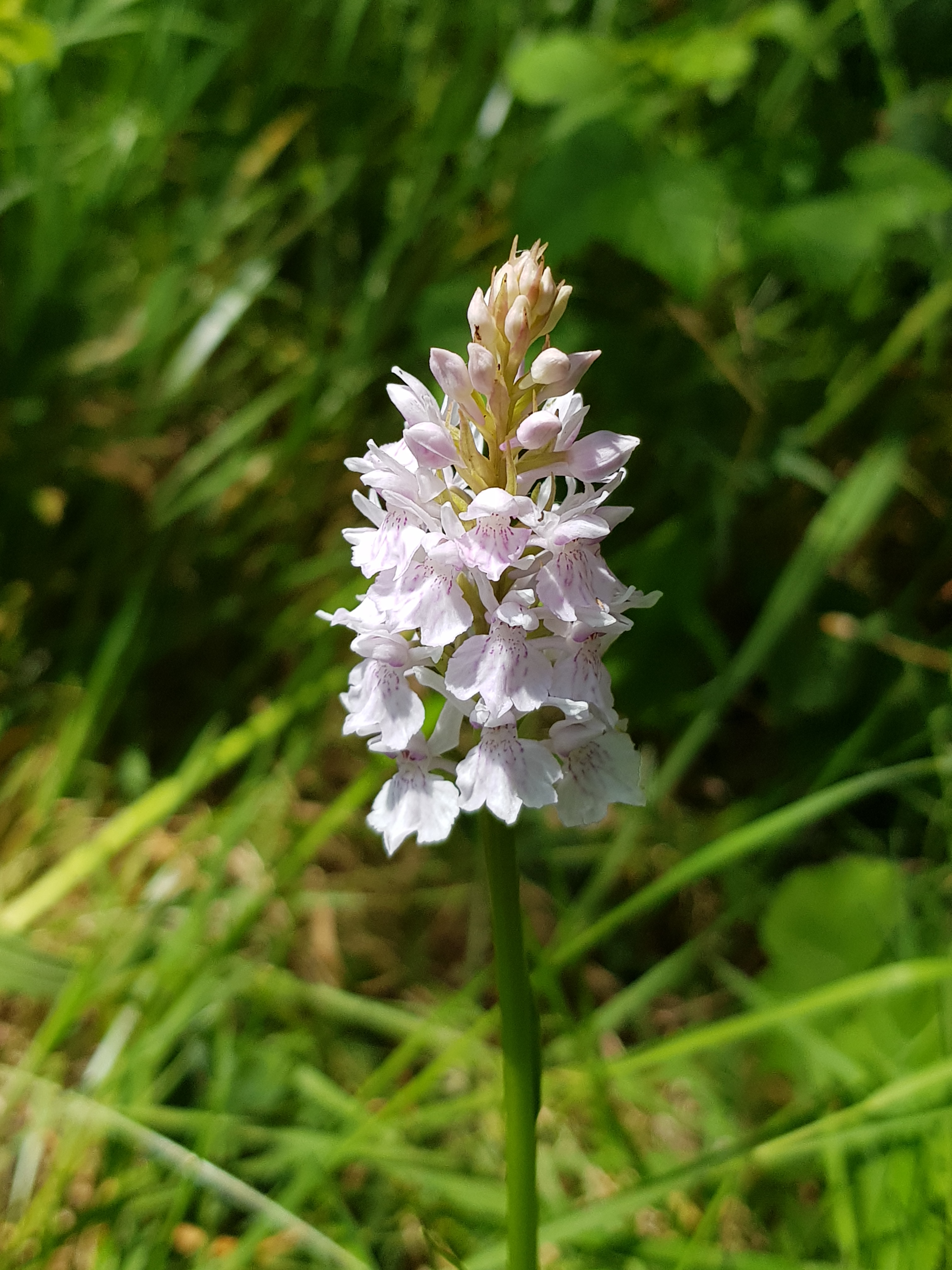
Heath spotted orchid, Dactylorhiza maculata

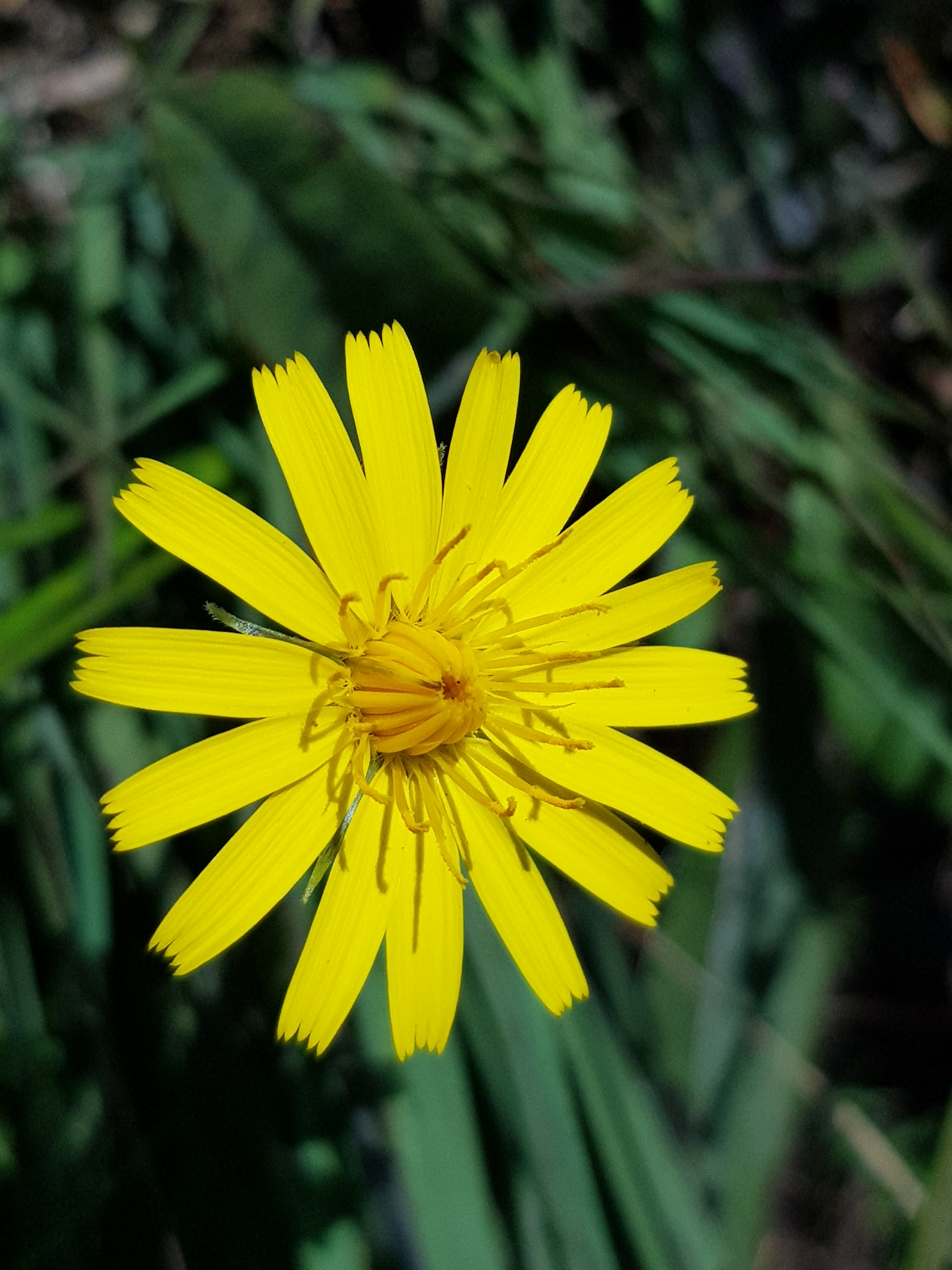
Autumn Hawkbit, Leontodon autumnalis

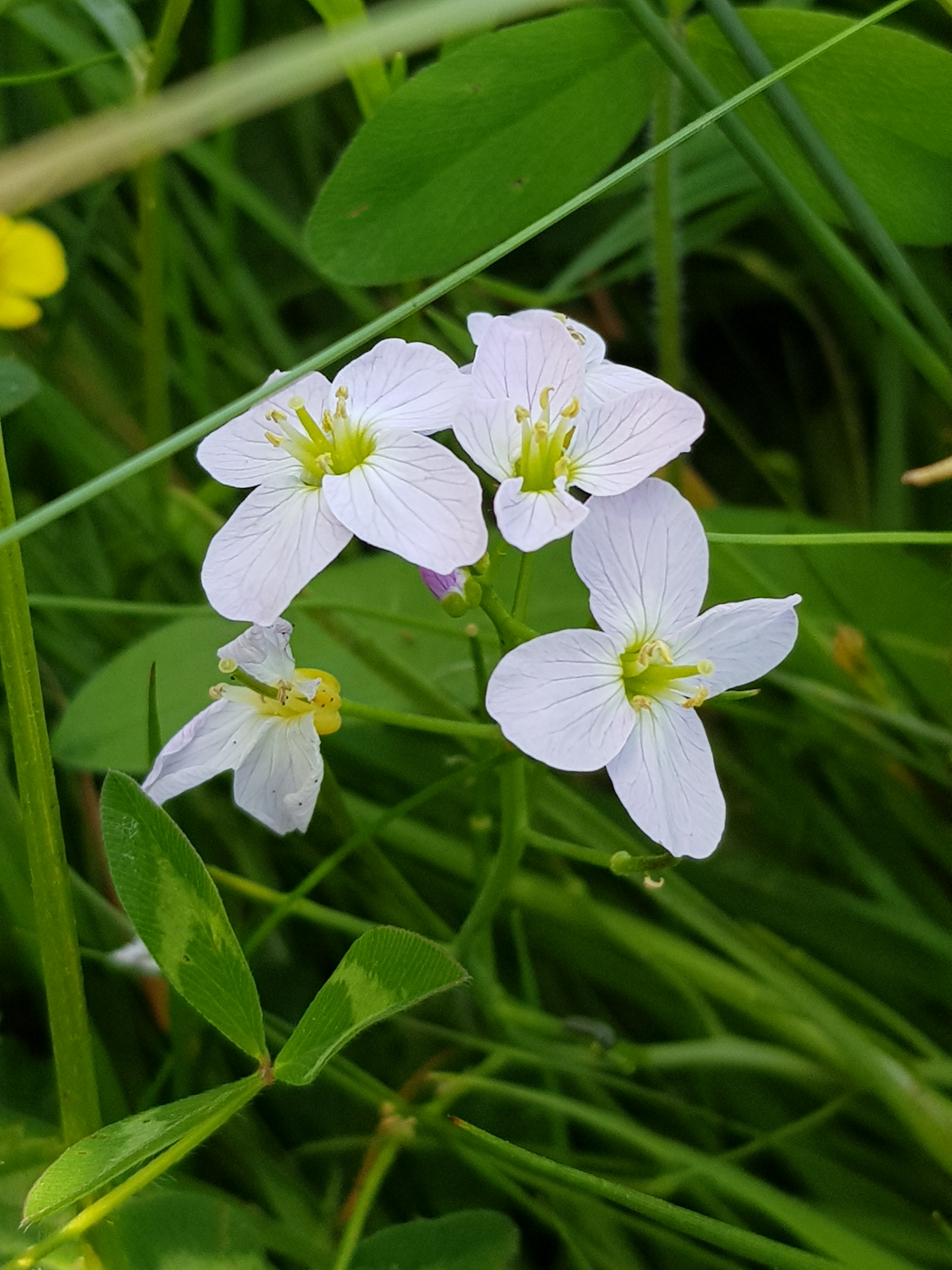
Cuckoo flower / Lady's Smock, Cardamine pratensis
