= Coleophora tetrazonella =

Scientific classification
- Kingdom: Animalia
- Phylum: Arthropoda
- Class: Insecta
- Order: Lepidoptera
- Family: Coleophoridae
- Genus: Coleophora
- Species: C. tetrazonella

Binomial name
- Coleophora tetrazonella (Erschoff, 1874)

Synonyms
- Laverna tetrazonella Erschoff, 1874

Species of moth

Coleophora tetrazonella is a moth of the family Coleophoridae. It is found in Samarkand, Uzbekistan.
