= Ballynafagh Bog =

Ecological site in County Kildare, Ireland

Ballynafagh Bog, Kildare
- Portach Baile na Faiche
- Location within Ireland
- Location: County Kildare, Ireland
- Nearest city: Prosperous
- Coordinates: 53°17′42″N 6°46′39″W
- Area: 155.23 ha (383.6 acres)
- Governing body: National Parks and Wildlife Service

The Ballynafagh Bog (Irish: Portach Baile na Faiche) Special Area of Conservation or SAC is a Natura 2000 site in County Kildare, close to the town of Prosperous in County Kildare, Ireland. The three qualifying interests by which this site is protected as an SAC are the presence of active raised bog, of degraded raised bogs still capable of natural regeneration, and of depressions on peat substrates of the Rhynchosporion.

== Location ==
The Ballynafagh Bog SAC is located close to Prosperous, in the townlands of Ballynafagh, Coolree (E.D. Robertstown) and Downings North, County Kildare. Schedule 1 of the Statutory Instrument for this site (S.I. No. 141/2017) identifies it as encompassing an area of 155.23 hectares. A detailed map of the area is included in the National Parks and Wildlife Service Conservation Objectives for the site.

== Special Area of Conservation qualification ==
The Ballynafagh Bog site was designated as a Natura 2000 site (‘Site of Community Importance’ or SCI) in 1997 under the Habitats Directive. Statutory Instrument No. 141 of 2017, establishing the site as an SAC (Site code: 000391), was passed in 2017. The ecological features which qualify this site for an SAC designation are

- Active raised bogs (priority feature) [Natura 2000 code 7110]
- Degraded raised bogs still capable of natural regeneration [Natura 2000 code 7120]
- Depressions on peat substrates of the Rhynchosporion [Natura 2000 code 7150]

The Biodiversity Information System for Europe website notes that Ballynafagh Bog is one of the most easterly examples of a relatively intact raised bog in Ireland. There are only two of these types of sites in County Kildare (the other being Mouds Bog). The Ballynafagh Bog site is also a proposed National Heritage Area site or pNHA. Close to the Ballynafagh Bog SAC is the Ballynafagh Lake SAC, which is also a pNHA.

== Features ==
The Ballynafagh Bog site includes approximately 70 hectares of uncut high bog. The high bog includes an area of 23 hectares of wet active bog, and approximately 44 hectares of degraded raised bog which is drying out. This area is surrounded by a larger area of approximately 90 hectares of cutover bog.

=== Active raised bog ===
Of the three features qualifying this site as an SAC, the priority ecological feature of this site is the presence of active raised bog, where there is a high, wet, peat-forming bog with a high percentage cover of Sphagnum spp., and where some or all of these features are present: hummocks, pools, wet flats, Sphagnum lawns, flushes and/or soaks. The National Parks and Wildlife Service (NPWS) Site Synopsis notes that there is a system of tear pools at the wet, active, peat-forming area towards the centre of the bog. These are overgrown with the bog mosses Sphagnum capillifolium and Sphagnum magellanicum. A pool-and-hummock system occurs at this site, where the pools contain a further bog moss species: Sphagnum cuspidatum. Other key plants occurring in wet channels here include white beak-sedge, cottongrasses (Eriophorum spp.) and great sundew (Drosera anglica). These plants proliferate in this wet channels, while on the hummocks bog rosemary (Andromeda polifolia) and cranberry (Vaccinium oxycoccos) are to be found.

=== Degraded raised bogs ===
The Ballynafagh Bog also includes areas of degraded raised bogs capable of regeneration – these are sections of the raised bog where the hydrology of the system has been negatively impacted by factors such as drainage, peat-cutting or other land use activities, but for which regeneration of this ecosystem is still possible. The flora in the degraded areas of the bog includes bog asphodel, cross-leaved heath (Erica tetralix), deergrass, hare's-tail cottongrass (Eriophorum vaginatum) and heather (Calluna vulgaris). In this area, the peat is dry (rather than wet as in the active raised bog), and supports colonisation by downy birch (Betula pubescens) and gorse (Ulex europaeus). Heather, as well as the moss Hypnum cupressiforme, grow in the driest areas of the high bog dome. In the cutaway bog at the site, the plant life includes rushes (Juncus spp.) and common cottongrass (Eriophorum angustifolium). Downy birch grows in patches of woodland.

=== Depressions on peat substrates of the Rhynchosporion ===
The third feature that qualifies Ballynafagh Bog as an SAC is the presence of a specific habitat: depressions on peat substrates of the Rhynchosporion. This comprises:

“Highly constant pioneer communities of humid exposed peat or, sometimes, sand, with Rhynchospora alba, Rhynchospora fusca, Drosera intermedia, Drosera rotundifolia, and Lycopodiella inundata, forming on stripped areas of blanket bogs or raised bogs, but also on naturally seep- or frost-eroded areas of wet heaths and bogs, in flushes and in the fluctuation zone of oligotrophic pools with sandy, slightly peaty substratum. These communities are similar, and closely related, to those of shallow bog hollows (Pal. 51.122) and of transition mires (Pal. 54.57).”

At this site, the Rhynchosporion habitat is to be found in erosion channels, pool edges and wet depressions. The flora includes white beak-sedge (Rhynchospora alba) and brown beak-sedge (Rhynchospora fusca). It also includes bog asphodel (Narthecium ossifragum), sundews (Drosera spp.), deergrass (Scirpus cespitosus) and/or carnation sedge (Carex panicea).

=== Birds ===
Protected bird species recorded at this site include merlin (Falco columbarius), snipe (Gallinago gallinago) and curlew (Numenius arquata). This Special Area of Conservation is adjacent to the Ballynafagh Lake wildfowl sanctuary and SAC, and likely to be used by the birds of that site.

== Conservation objectives ==
The conservation objectives for the Ballynafagh Bog site were published in 2015. The primary conservation objective for the site is to restore the favourable conservation condition of the active raised bog. The long-term aim for the degraded raised bog habitat is to re-establish its peat-forming capability, which is linked to the conservation objective for the active raised bog. The existence of the ‘Depressions on peat substrates of the Rhynchosporion’ habitat is a feature of good quality active raised bogs. For these reasons, separate conservation objectives are not set for these two habitats. A key conservation objective for the raised bog is to restore the area of this site to 26.6 hectares (subject to natural processes). In 2014, the active raised bog was mapped as comprising an area of 6.5 hectares. The degraded raised bog area was mapped at 9.9 hectares. Of this, only 6.9 hectares can feasibly be restored to active raised bog (by means of drain blocking), giving a total potential restoration of 13.4 hectares of active raised bog. A further 13.2 hectares of the cutover section of the site was estimated to be restorable also, giving a total of 26.6 hectares of restored active raised bog as a conservation objective. The restoration plan for Ballynafagh Bog SAC to meet the conservation targets for the site were published in 2022.

== Threats ==
The EUNIS website lists the known threats to this SAC. Peat extraction is ranked as the highest threat to the site. Listed as medium-level threats are: Forest planting on open ground; improved access to site; and other human intrusions and disturbances. Recorded as low-level threats to the site are fire and fire suppression; and Other patterns of habitation. In 2018, a plan to relocate turf cutters from Ballynafagh Bog to Coolree bog (considered a degraded bog) was proposed. However, planning for this was rejected as it would entail re-opening an inactive bog for turf-cutting and would be contrary to the proper planning and sustainable development of the area and to climate action policy objectives, and because it would set an undesirable precedent for further development of inactive bogs and result in a loss of natural landscape.
