= Myelois vestaliella =

Scientific classification
- Kingdom: Animalia
- Phylum: Arthropoda
- Clade: Pancrustacea
- Class: Insecta
- Order: Lepidoptera
- Family: Pyralidae
- Genus: Myelois
- Species: M. vestaliella

Binomial name
- Myelois vestaliella (Erschoff, 1874)

Synonyms
- Epischnia vestaliella Erschoff, 1874

Species of moth

Myelois vestaliella is a species of snout moth in the genus Myelois. It was described by Nikolay Grigoryevich Erschoff in 1874. It is found in the Kyzylkum Desert in central Asia.
