= Myelois urbicella =

Scientific classification
- Kingdom: Animalia
- Phylum: Arthropoda
- Clade: Pancrustacea
- Class: Insecta
- Order: Lepidoptera
- Family: Pyralidae
- Genus: Myelois
- Species: M. urbicella

Binomial name
- Myelois urbicella Erschoff, 1874

Species of moth

Myelois urbicella is a species of snout moth in the genus Myelois. It was described by Nikolay Grigoryevich Erschoff in 1874. It is found in Turkestan.
