= Scopula halimodendrata =

Scientific classification
- Domain: Eukaryota
- Kingdom: Animalia
- Phylum: Arthropoda
- Class: Insecta
- Order: Lepidoptera
- Family: Geometridae
- Genus: Scopula
- Species: S. halimodendrata

Binomial name
- Scopula halimodendrata (Erschoff, 1874)

Synonyms
- Acidalia halimodendrata Erschoff, 1874

Species of geometer moth in subfamily Sterrhinae

Scopula halimodendrata is a moth of the family Geometridae described by Nikolay Grigoryevich Erschoff in 1874. It is found in Turkmenistan, Tajikistan and Kazakhstan.
