= Ectomyelois =

Scientific classification
- Kingdom: Animalia
- Phylum: Arthropoda
- Clade: Pancrustacea
- Class: Insecta
- Order: Lepidoptera
- Family: Pyralidae
- Tribe: Phycitini
- Genus: Ectomyelois; Heinrich, 1956

Genus of moths

Ectomyelois is a genus of small moths belonging to the family Pyralidae.

== Species ==
- Ectomyelois austrella Neunzig & Goodson, 1992
- Ectomyelois bipectinalis Ren & Yang, 2016
- Ectomyelois ceratoniae (Zeller, 1839)
- Ectomyelois decolor (Zeller, 1881)
- Ectomyelois furvidorsella (Ragonot, 1888)
- Ectomyelois furvivena Ren & Yang, 2016
- Ectomyelois muriscis (Dyar, 1914)
- Ectomyelois zeteki Heinrich, 1956

== Taxonomy ==
Ectomyelois is placed as a synonym of Apomyelois by some authors.
