= Myelois famula =

Scientific classification
- Kingdom: Animalia
- Phylum: Arthropoda
- Clade: Pancrustacea
- Class: Insecta
- Order: Lepidoptera
- Family: Pyralidae
- Genus: Myelois
- Species: M. famula

Binomial name
- Myelois famula Zeller, 1881

Synonyms
- Salebria famula; Myelois restrictella Zeller, 1881

Species of moth

Myelois famula is a species of snout moth in the genus Myelois. It was described by Zeller in 1881, and is known from Colombia. It is considered to be a plant pest.
