= Apomyelois =

Scientific classification
- Kingdom: Animalia
- Phylum: Arthropoda
- Clade: Pancrustacea
- Class: Insecta
- Order: Lepidoptera
- Family: Pyralidae
- Tribe: Phycitini
- Genus: Apomyelois; Heinrich, 1956

Genus of moths

Apomyelois is a genus of small moths belonging to the family Pyralidae. The genus was erected by Carl Heinrich in 1956.

Species of Apomyelois

- Apomyelois artonoma (Meyrick, 1935)
- Apomyelois bicolorata Balinsky, 1991
- Apomyelois bistriatella (Hulst, 1887)
- Apomyelois cognata (Staudinger, 1871)
- Apomyelois decolor (Zeller, 1881)
- Apomyelois ehrendorferi (Malicky & Roesler, 1970)

The former A. striatella is now in Didia. The locust bean moth (A. ceratoniae) is placed in Ectomyelois by some authors, while others place Ectomyelois as a synonym of Apomyelois.
