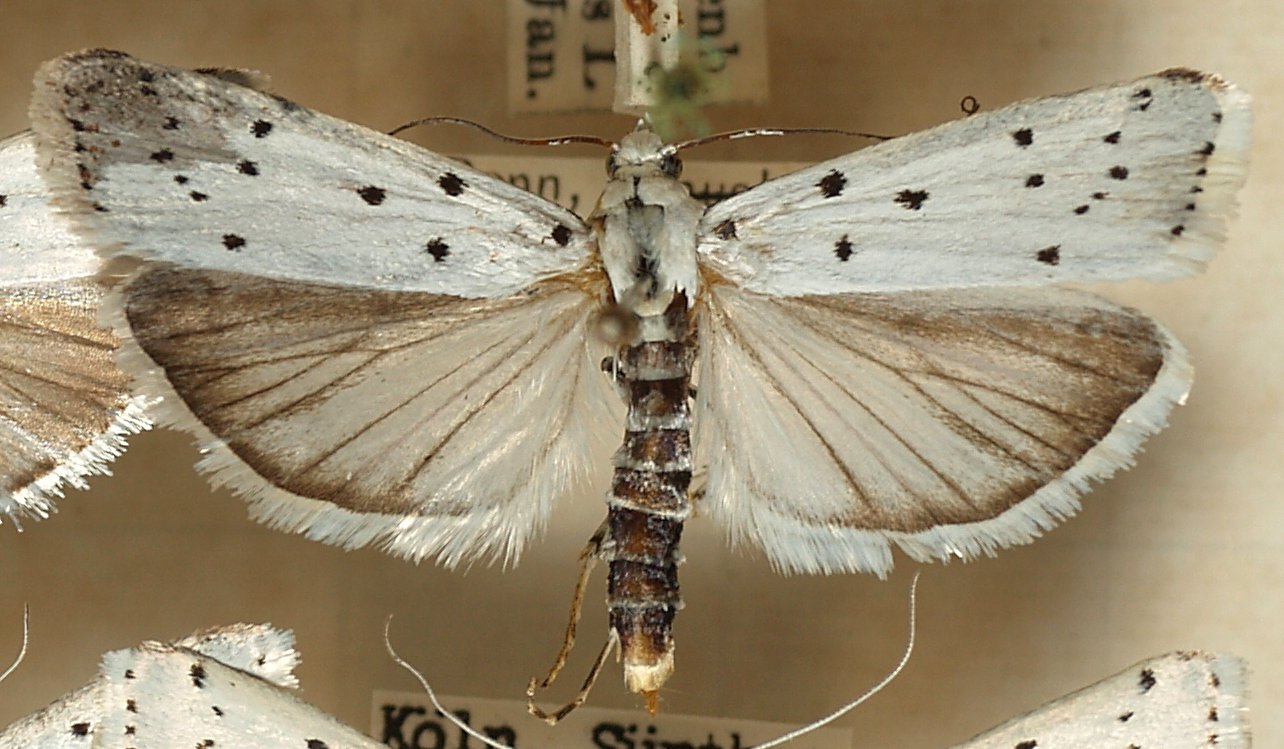

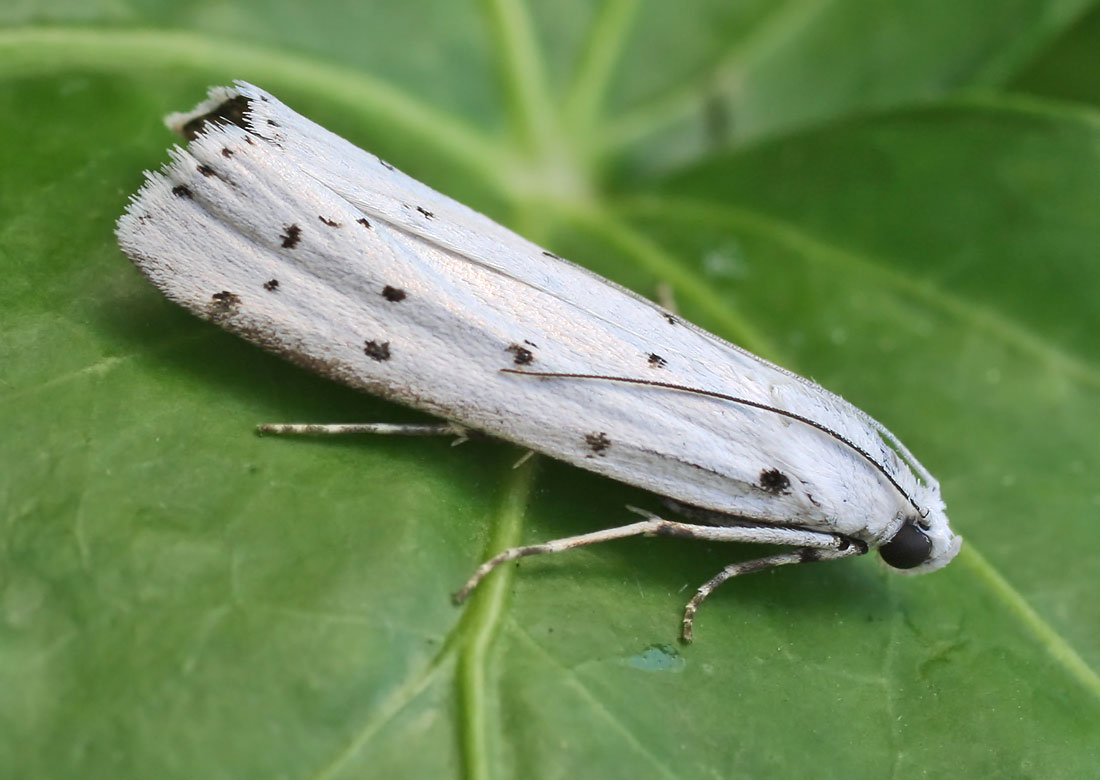

Scientific classification
- Kingdom: Animalia
- Phylum: Arthropoda
- Clade: Pancrustacea
- Class: Insecta
- Order: Lepidoptera
- Family: Pyralidae
- Genus: Myelois
- Species: M. circumvoluta

Binomial name
- Myelois circumvoluta (Fourcroy, 1785)

Synonyms
- Tinea circumvoluta Fourcroy, 1785; Myelois cribrella; Tinea cribrella Hübner, 1796; Myelois britannicella Amsel, 1951; Phalaena cardui Haworth, 1811

= Myelois circumvoluta =

Species of moth

Myelois circumvoluta, the thistle ermine, is a small moth species of the family Pyralidae. It is found in Europe.

This pyralid has a pattern of black dots on its whitish forewings, resembling many ermine moths (family Yponomeutidae). Among the Lepidoptera, the pyralids and the ermine moths are not closely related, however: the latter are basal Ditrysia, while the former belong to the much more advanced Obtectomera.

The wingspan is 27–33 millimetres (1.1–1.3 in). The moth flies in one generation in late spring to early summer, e.g. from the end of May to June in Belgium and the Netherlands.

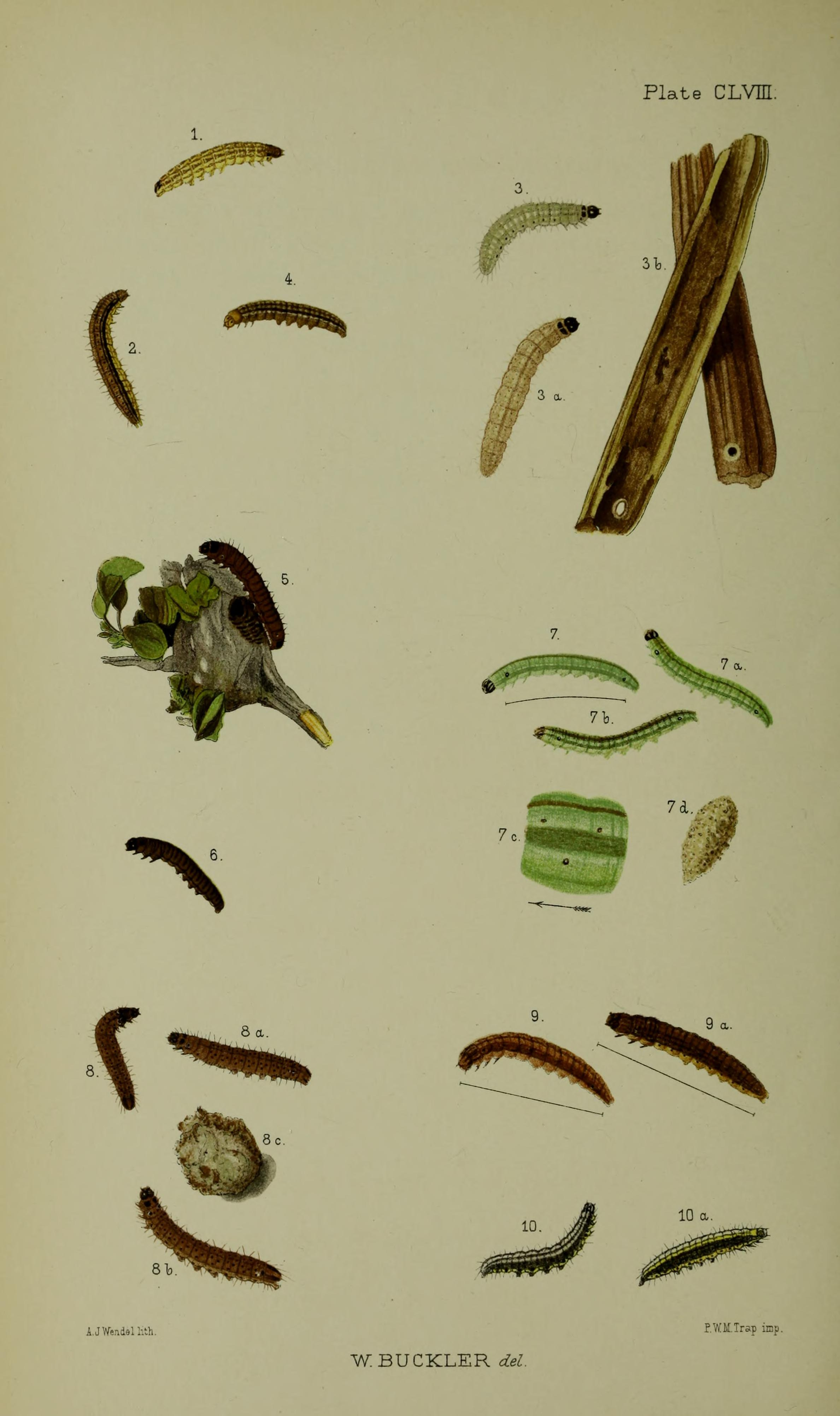
Figs.3, 3a larvae in various stages of growth, 3b bored thistle stems showing exit hole

The caterpillars feed on Cardueae (Cynareae) thistles – greater burdock (Arctium lappa), cotton thistle (Onopordum acanthium), and Carduus and Cirsium species.
