= Apomyelois ehrendorferi =

Scientific classification
- Kingdom: Animalia
- Phylum: Arthropoda
- Clade: Pancrustacea
- Class: Insecta
- Order: Lepidoptera
- Family: Pyralidae
- Genus: Apomyelois
- Species: A. ehrendorferi

Binomial name
- Apomyelois ehrendorferi (Malicky & Roesler, 1970)

Synonyms
- Spectrobates ehrendorferi Malicky & Roesler, 1970

Species of moth

Apomyelois ehrendorferi is a species of snout moth in the genus Apomyelois. It was described by Hans Malicky and Rolf-Ulrich Roesler, in 1970. It is found on Sardinia.
