= Myelois mystica =

Scientific classification
- Kingdom: Animalia
- Phylum: Arthropoda
- Clade: Pancrustacea
- Class: Insecta
- Order: Lepidoptera
- Family: Pyralidae
- Genus: Myelois
- Species: M. mystica

Binomial name
- Myelois mystica Roesler, 1988

Species of moth

Myelois mystica is a species of snout moth in the genus Myelois. It was described by Rolf-Ulrich Roesler in 1988, and is known from Afghanistan (including Paghman, the type location).
