= Myelois multiflorella =

Scientific classification
- Kingdom: Animalia
- Phylum: Arthropoda
- Clade: Pancrustacea
- Class: Insecta
- Order: Lepidoptera
- Family: Pyralidae
- Genus: Myelois
- Species: M. multiflorella

Binomial name
- Myelois multiflorella Ragonot, 1887

Synonyms
- Myelois luteotinctella Caradja, 1910; Myelois multiflorella ronja Roesler, 1988

Species of moth

Myelois multiflorella is a species of snout moth. It is found from Sicily, Romania and Bulgaria east to Mongolia.
