= Ectomyelois muriscis =

Scientific classification
- Kingdom: Animalia
- Phylum: Arthropoda
- Clade: Pancrustacea
- Class: Insecta
- Order: Lepidoptera
- Family: Pyralidae
- Genus: Ectomyelois
- Species: E. muriscis

Binomial name
- Ectomyelois muriscis (Dyar, 1914)

Synonyms
- Hypsipyla muriscis Dyar, 1914; Ectomyelois muriscus; Myelois palpalis Dyar, 1919

Species of moth

Ectomyelois muriscis is a species of snout moth. It was originally described by Harrison Gray Dyar Jr. in 1914 and is found in Central America, northern South America, and the West Indian Archipelago.

The larvae of this species feed inside the pods of Theobroma cacao, Theobroma simiarum and other fruits.
