= Myelois pollinella =

Scientific classification
- Kingdom: Animalia
- Phylum: Arthropoda
- Clade: Pancrustacea
- Class: Insecta
- Order: Lepidoptera
- Family: Pyralidae
- Genus: Myelois
- Species: M. pollinella

Binomial name
- Myelois pollinella Christoph, 1877

Species of moth

Myelois pollinella is a species of snout moth in the genus Myelois. It was described by Hugo Theodor Christoph in 1877 and is known from Turkmenistan (including Krasnowodsk, the type location).
