= Myelois pluripunctella =

Scientific classification
- Kingdom: Animalia
- Phylum: Arthropoda
- Clade: Pancrustacea
- Class: Insecta
- Order: Lepidoptera
- Family: Pyralidae
- Genus: Myelois
- Species: M. pluripunctella

Binomial name
- Myelois pluripunctella Ragonot, 1887

Species of moth

Myelois pluripunctella is a species of snout moth. It is found in Greece and Lebanon.

The wingspan is about 27 mm.
