= Myelois ossicolor =

Scientific classification
- Kingdom: Animalia
- Phylum: Arthropoda
- Clade: Pancrustacea
- Class: Insecta
- Order: Lepidoptera
- Family: Pyralidae
- Genus: Myelois
- Species: M. ossicolor

Binomial name
- Myelois ossicolor Ragonot, 1893

Species of moth

Myelois ossicolor is a species of snout moth. It is found on Cyprus and in Turkey.

The wingspan is about 24 mm.
