= Carob moth =

Carob moths are certain species of small snout moths (family Pyralidae). They are named for their caterpillars' habit of becoming a pest on stored fruits of carob (Ceratonia siliqua).

The term can refer to:

- Ectomyelois ceratoniae (locust bean moth)
- Cadra calidella (dried fruit moth)
