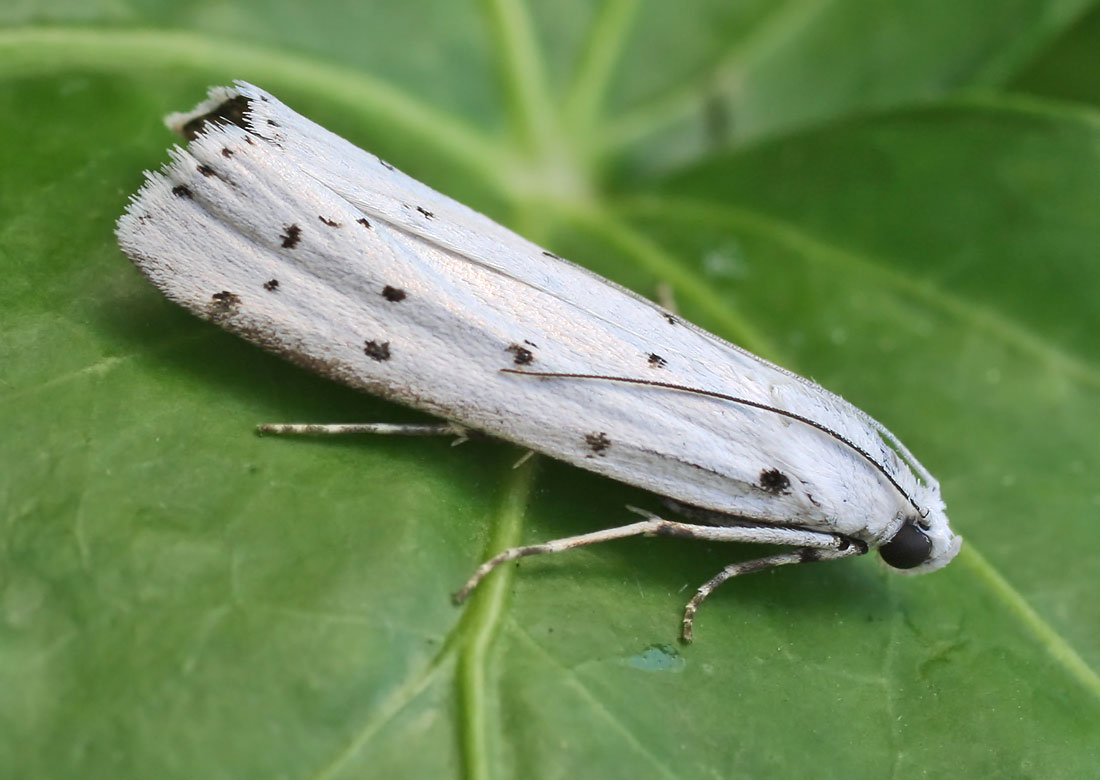
- Thistle ermine (Myelois circumvoluta)

Scientific classification
- Kingdom: Animalia
- Phylum: Arthropoda
- Clade: Pancrustacea
- Class: Insecta
- Order: Lepidoptera
- Family: Pyralidae
- Subfamily: Phycitinae
- Tribe: Phycitini
- Genus: Myelois; Hübner, 1825

Synonyms
- Gnathogutta Roesler, 1988; Lispe Treitschke, 1832 (non Latreille, 1796: preoccupied); Myclois (lapsus); Myelophila Treitschke, 1835

= Myelois =

Genus of moths

Myelois is a genus of small moths belonging to the family Pyralidae. They are found in western Eurasia and adjacent regions such as the Maghreb.

Species of Myelois include:

- Myelois albistriga Erschoff, 1874
- Myelois cinctipalpella Christoph, 1877
- Myelois circumvoluta (Fourcroy, 1785) – thistle ermine
- Myelois cribratella Zeller, 1847
- Myelois echinopisella Chrétien, 1911
- Myelois famula Zeller, 1881
- Myelois fuscicostella Mann, 1861
- Myelois multiflorella Ragonot, 1887
- Myelois mystica Roesler, 1988
- Myelois osseella Ragonot, 1887
- Myelois ossicolor Ragonot, 1893
- Myelois pluripunctella Ragonot, 1887
- Myelois pollinella Christoph, 1877
- Myelois urbicella Erschoff, 1874
- Myelois vestaliella Erschoff, 1874

Formerly included here were related genera like Apomyelois. The genus Kyra is sometimes listed as a junior synonym of Myelois, but its type species is usually now placed in Eurhodope (as E. cirrigerella).
