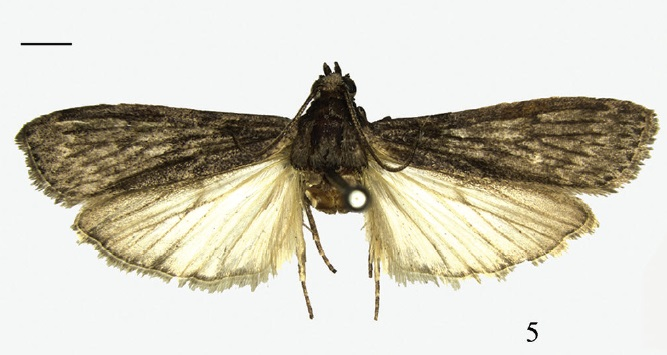

Scientific classification
- Domain: Eukaryota
- Kingdom: Animalia
- Phylum: Arthropoda
- Class: Insecta
- Order: Lepidoptera
- Family: Pyralidae
- Genus: Ectomyelois
- Species: E. furvivena

Binomial name
- Ectomyelois furvivena Ren & Yang, 2016

= Ectomyelois furvivena =

Species of moth

Ectomyelois furvivena is a species of snout moth. It is found in China (Gansu, Yunnan).

The wingspan is 25−30 mm. The forewings are dark greyish brown with some white powdering and black along the veins. The antemedial line is invisible, and the discal spots are blackish brown and separated. The postmedial line is faint, greyish white, and serrated, gently curved inwardly from the costal one-fifth to the dorsum at one-fifth. The terminal line is black and interrupted. The hindwings are greyish white, and light brown along the costa and veins.

== Etymology ==
The species name is derived from the Latin prefix furv- (meaning black) and Latin vena (meaning vein) and refers to the forewing with black scales along its veins.
