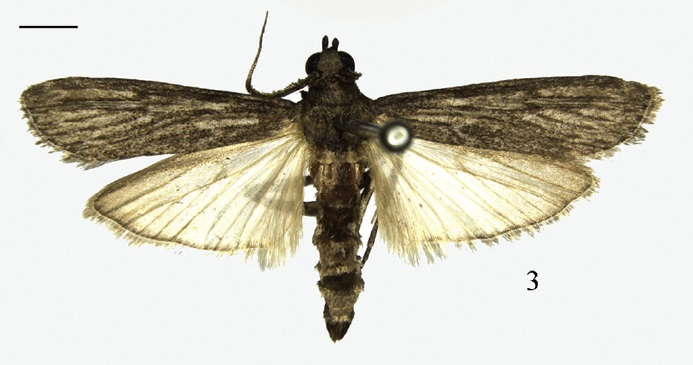

Scientific classification
- Domain: Eukaryota
- Kingdom: Animalia
- Phylum: Arthropoda
- Class: Insecta
- Order: Lepidoptera
- Family: Pyralidae
- Genus: Ectomyelois
- Species: E. bipectinalis

Binomial name
- Ectomyelois bipectinalis Ren & Yang, 2016

= Ectomyelois bipectinalis =

Species of moth

Ectomyelois bipectinalis is a species of snout moth. It is found in China (Fujian, Gansu, Guangxi, Hainan, Yunnan).

The wingspan is 19.5−28 mm. The forewings are dark greyish fuscous, blackish brown along the veins. The antemedial line is invisible and the discal spots are blackish brown and separated. The postmedial line is faint, greyish white and serrated. The terminal line is black and interrupted. The hindwings are greyish white, pale brown along the costa, termen and veins.

== Etymology ==
The species name is derived from the Latin prefix bi- (meaning two) and Latin pectinalis (meaning pectinate) and refers to the bipectinate male flagellum.
