= Myelois cribratella =

Scientific classification
- Kingdom: Animalia
- Phylum: Arthropoda
- Clade: Pancrustacea
- Class: Insecta
- Order: Lepidoptera
- Family: Pyralidae
- Genus: Myelois
- Species: M. cribratella

Binomial name
- Myelois cribratella Zeller, 1847

Synonyms
- Myelois pallipedella Ragonot, 1893

Species of moth

Myelois cribratella is a species of snout moth. It is found in Romania and on Sicily, Sardinia and Corsica.
