= Myelois echinopisella =

Scientific classification
- Kingdom: Animalia
- Phylum: Arthropoda
- Clade: Pancrustacea
- Class: Insecta
- Order: Lepidoptera
- Family: Pyralidae
- Genus: Myelois
- Species: M. echinopisella

Binomial name
- Myelois echinopisella Chrétien, 1911

Synonyms
- Myelois micropunctella Amsel, 1951; Myelois octopunctella Amsel, 1968

Species of moth

Myelois echinopisella is a species of snout moth in the genus Myelois. It was described by Pierre Chrétien in 1911 and is known from Pakistan, Iran and North Africa, including Algeria.
