= Apomyelois artonoma =

Scientific classification
- Kingdom: Animalia
- Phylum: Arthropoda
- Class: Insecta
- Order: Lepidoptera
- Family: Pyralidae
- Genus: Apomyelois
- Species: A. artonoma

Binomial name
- Apomyelois artonoma (Meyrick, 1935)

Synonyms
- Spectrobates artonoma Meyrick, 1935

Species of moth

Apomyelois artonoma is a species of snout moth in the genus Apomyelois. It was described by Edward Meyrick in 1935. It is found on Java in Indonesia.
