= Myelois osseella =

Scientific classification
- Kingdom: Animalia
- Phylum: Arthropoda
- Clade: Pancrustacea
- Class: Insecta
- Order: Lepidoptera
- Family: Pyralidae
- Genus: Myelois
- Species: M. osseella

Binomial name
- Myelois osseella Ragonot, 1887

Synonyms
- Myelois jerusalemella Amsel, 1935

Species of moth

Myelois osseella is a species of snout moth in the genus Myelois. It was described by Émile Louis Ragonot in 1887 and is known from Lebanon, Israel and North Africa, including Tunisia.
