= Apomyelois bicolorata =

Scientific classification
- Domain: Eukaryota
- Kingdom: Animalia
- Phylum: Arthropoda
- Class: Insecta
- Order: Lepidoptera
- Family: Pyralidae
- Genus: Apomyelois
- Species: A. bicolorata

Binomial name
- Apomyelois bicolorata Balinsky, 1991

Species of moth

Apomyelois bicolorata is a species of snout moth in the genus Apomyelois. It was described by Boris Balinsky in 1991 and is known from South Africa.
