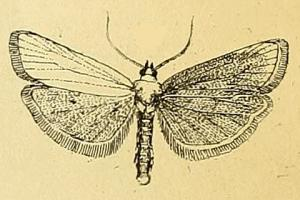

Scientific classification
- Kingdom: Animalia
- Phylum: Arthropoda
- Clade: Pancrustacea
- Class: Insecta
- Order: Lepidoptera
- Family: Pyralidae
- Genus: Myelois
- Species: M. fuscicostella

Binomial name
- Myelois fuscicostella Mann, 1861

Synonyms
- Myelois nivosella Ragonot, 1890

= Myelois fuscicostella =

Species of moth

Myelois fuscicostella is a species of snout moth. It is found in Spain, Portugal, Algeria and Kazakhstan.
