= Myelois cinctipalpella =

Scientific classification
- Kingdom: Animalia
- Phylum: Arthropoda
- Clade: Pancrustacea
- Class: Insecta
- Order: Lepidoptera
- Family: Pyralidae
- Genus: Myelois
- Species: M. cinctipalpella

Binomial name
- Myelois cinctipalpella Christoph, 1877

Species of moth

Myelois cinctipalpella is a species of snout moth in the genus Myelois. It was described by Hugo Theodor Christoph in 1877. It is found in Turkmenistan.
