= Apomyelois decolor =

Scientific classification
- Kingdom: Animalia
- Phylum: Arthropoda
- Clade: Pancrustacea
- Class: Insecta
- Order: Lepidoptera
- Family: Pyralidae
- Genus: Apomyelois
- Species: A. decolor

Binomial name
- Apomyelois decolor (Zeller, 1881)

Synonyms
- Myelois decolor Zeller, 1881; Ectomyelois decolor; Nephopteryx ephestiella Hampson, 1901

Species of moth

Apomyelois decolor, the Caribbean dried fruit moth, is a species of snout moth in the genus Apomyelois. It was described by Philipp Christoph Zeller in 1881. It is found in France, Florida, the Antilles, Central America and South America.

The wingspan is 19–30 mm. The forewings are dark grayish fuscous with some white powdering in the basal area and considerably more in the median area from slightly above inner margin and in the outer area between the subterminal line and the termen. The hindwings are smoky white to pale smoky fuscous.

The larvae have been recorded in fruits of Annona squamosa, Ceratonia siliqua and Hymenaea courbaril.
