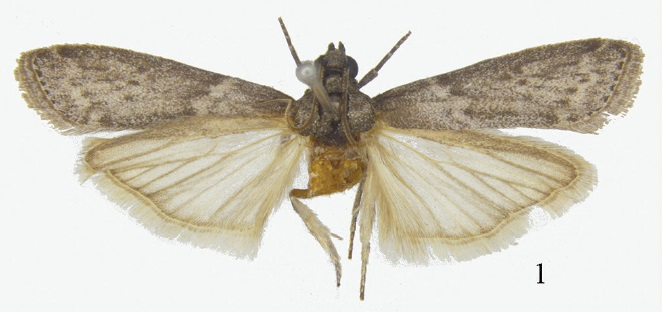

Scientific classification
- Kingdom: Animalia
- Phylum: Arthropoda
- Clade: Pancrustacea
- Class: Insecta
- Order: Lepidoptera
- Family: Pyralidae
- Genus: Ectomyelois
- Species: E. ceratoniae

Binomial name
- Ectomyelois ceratoniae (Zeller, 1839)

Synonyms
- Numerous, see text

= Ectomyelois ceratoniae =

Species of moth

Ectomyelois ceratoniae, the locust bean moth, more ambiguously known as "carob moth", is a moth of the family Pyralidae. It has a nearly cosmopolitan distribution.

The larvae are translucent white, with the internal organs visible from the outside. They feed on the seeds and pods of a wide range of plants, including Punica granatum, Citrus fruit, Pistacia vera, Juglans regia, Prunus dulcis, Macadamia integrifolia, Acacia farnesiana, Caesalpinia sappan, Cassia bicapsularis, Ricinus, Erythrina monosperma, Haematoxylum campechianum, Prosopis juliflora, Samanea saman, Phoenix dactylifera, and Ceratonia siliqua. It is a considerable agricultural pest, recognized as the most economically damaging pest of the date industry in California. In many regions around the world, it also damages many other high-value nut and fruit commodities such as almonds, pistachios, macadamias, pomegranates, and stone and pome fruits.

Pheromone mimic lures are commercially available.

In 2007, the California date Phoenix dactylifera industry produced 17,700 tons of dates on 5,900 acres, with a gross value of about $31.86 million. During the past 25 years, the locust bean moth has caused between 10 and 40% damage of the harvestable crop annually, which equates to roughly $3.1 – $12.7 million in economic losses, not including control costs.

Until recently, the only current of controlling locust bean moth was malathion dusting, three or four times per growing season. Because of the height of the palm trees (sometimes over 50 ft), commercial treatments were applied exclusively by powerful dusting equipment that delivers the insecticidal dust through a hand-directed tube. This produces a "fog" of insecticide during application that essentially blankets the ground with malathion, which is wasteful and creates unintended nontarget effects on other animal species, as well as "environmental pollution". Furthermore, the accumulation of the malathion dust on the skin of dates creates problems with desiccation of the fruit, reducing the overall quality of the product. Encroachment of date gardens and urban areas has been forcing the California date producers to move away from malathion dusting, but until recently, no other alternatives for locust bean moth control were available.

The mimic pheromone used in monitoring lures also provided a viable nontoxic alternative of locust bean moth control. When the mimic pheromone is formulated into SPLAT, it can be used to control moth populations through "mating disruption" in date gardens and pomegranate and almond orchards. Extensive field trials with the mimic pheromone formulation SPLAT EC and its organic counterpart, SPLAT EC-Organic, have proven that effective season-long control of populations in date gardens is achieved after a single application of the pheromone mimic formulation. SPLAT EC or SPLAT EC-Organic are deployed as preventive measures to protect an area from locust bean moth infestation. The products do not "kill" the moths, they control populations by disrupting their mating with the volatiles of the pheromone mimic emitted by SPLAT EC and SPLAT EC-O. Hence, the timing of the product application is important to optimally target the mating season.

== Synonyms ==
The species is also known under these obsolete names:

- Apomyelois ceratoniae (Zeller, 1839)
- Euzophera zellerella Sorhagen, 1881
- Heterographis rivulalis Warren & Rothschild, 1905
- Hypsipyla psarella Hampson, 1903
- Laodamia durandi Lucas, 1950
- Myelois ceratoniae Zeller, 1839
- Myelois oporedestella Dyar, 1911
- Myelois phoenicis Durrant, 1915
- Phycis ceratoniella Fischer von Röslerstamm, 1839
- Phycita dentilinella Hampson, 1896
- Trachonitis pryerella Vaughan, 1870

Ectomyelois tuerckheimiella is a doubtfully distinct taxon; it may be a cryptic species or yet another synonym.
