= Mouds Bog =

Ecological site in County Kildare, Ireland

- Portach Mouds
- Location within Ireland
- Location: County Kildare, Ireland
- Nearest city: Newbridge
- Coordinates: 53°12′53″N 6°49′02″W
- Area: 586.39 hectares (1,449.0 acres)
- Governing body: National Parks and Wildlife Service

The Mouds Bog (Irish: Portach Mouds) Special Area of Conservation or SAC is a Natura 2000 site based close to the Hill of Allen and to Newbridge, County Kildare, Ireland. The qualifying interests by which it is protected as an SAC are the presence of three habitat types: the presence of active raised bogs (priority habitat), the presence of degraded raised bogs still capable of natural regeneration, and the presence of depressions on peat substrates of Rhynchosporion vegetation.

== Location ==
The Mouds Bog SAC is located close to Newbridge, County Kildare, in the townlands of Baronstown East, Baronstown West (part of), Barretstown (E.D. Oldconnell), Clongownagh, Dunbyrne, Grangehiggin, Hawkfield, Roseberry and Tankardsgarden. Schedule 1 of the Statutory Instrument for this site identifies it as encompassing an area of 586.39 hectares.

== SAC qualification ==
The Mouds Bog site was designated as a Natura 2000 site in 2003 under the Habitats Directive. Statutory Instrument No. 62 of 2022, establishing the site as an SAC (Site code: 002331), was passed in 2022. The three features which qualify this site for an SAC designation are the presence of specific protected habitat types. These three habitats are:

- Active raised bogs (Natura 2000 code 7110; priority habitat)
- Degraded raised bogs still capable of natural regeneration (Natura 2000 code 7120)
- Depressions on peat substrates of the Rhynchosporion (Natura 2000 code 7150)

The National Parks and Wildlife Service (NPWS) has included the Mouds Bog site as a proposed Natural Heritage Area or pNHA. Very close to this site, Pollardstown Fen has also been included as a pNHA.

== Features ==
The National Parks and Wildlife Service site synopsis for the Mouds Bog Site describes the features of this SAC. The active raised bog component of the site includes wet, peat-forming high bog, with Sphagnum mosses occurring in “hummocks, pools, wet flats, Sphagnum lawns, flushes and soaks”. The SAC includes two basins of high bog, including wet quaking bog with well-formed pools, with a central mineral ridge running between them. There are small flush areas at the western side of the site, including a wet quaking soak.

"Mouds Bog is significant in terms of its high bog area and geographical location as it is at the eastern extreme of the range of raised bogs in Ireland. It is a site of considerable conservation significance comprising a large raised bog, a rare habitat in the E.U. and one that is becoming increasingly scarce and under threat in Ireland. This site supports a good diversity of raised bog microhabitats including hummock/hollow complexes, pools and flushes, and cutover, all of which add to the diversity and scientific value of the site".

In the Dúchas (the Heritage Service) Raised Bog Natural Heritage Areas (NHA) Project 2002 report by Derwin et al. to assess raised bogs for designation as Natural Heritage Areas, Mouds Bog was one of the sites selected under a range of categories - remote location, area of active peat formation, raised bogs with over 60 hectares of high bog area, geomorphology, and altitude greater than 90 metres. This report notes that this area consisted of 1605 hectares in the 1800s, and by 2002 (when Mouds Bog was a proposed SAC), only 17.9% of that area remained.

The first report of the Commissioners appointed to enquire into the nature and extent of the several bogs in Ireland and the practicability of draining and cultivating them, published in 1810 by the House of Commons, describes the Bog of Mouds and notes that it consists of red heath bog (2,830 Irish acres) and "old turbary, or bog cut out" (300 Irish acres), giving a total of 3,130 Irish acres, or 5,070 English acres. This report outlines plans for four drains to be constructed through Mouds Bog and also describes plans to build a road through the bog from the Lands of Caragh on the east side to the Leap of Allen to the west. The cost estimates for the main, minor and cross drains was given as £7,605 1s 6d.

=== Flora ===
The occurrence of a high percentage cover of species of Sphagnum moss is a key feature of active raised bog habitats such as this SAC. These species will also occur in the degraded raised bog habitat, but in this habitat, land use activities such as peat cutting have affected the hydrology of the bog. The third habitat at this SAC - Rhynchosporion vegetation – includes White Beak-sedge Rhynchospora alba) and/or Brown Beak-sedge (Rhynchospora fusca). This type of habitat also includes plants such as Bog Asphodel (Narthecium ossifragum), Carnation Sedge (Carex panicea). Deergrass (Scirpus cespitosus or Trichophorum cespitosum) and species of sundew (Drosera spp.).

Plant species such as Bog-rosemary (Andromeda polifolia), Cranberry (Vaccinium oxycoccos), and Heather (the Calluna species Calluna vulgaris) occur in this midland raised bog. A range of Sphagnum species (Sphagnum cuspidatum, Sphagnum magellanicum and Sphagnum capillifolium) are recorded as growing at the small pools to either side of the mineral ridge, along with Great Sundew (Drosera anglica).

Heather, Bog myrtle (Myrica gale) and Crowberry (Empetrum nigrum) grow at the hummock/hollow system to the south. Bog mosses, including Sphagnum tenellum, are recorded at the wet hollows, while Sphagnum cuspidatum and tall Common Cottongrass (Eriophorum angustifolium) occur at the wet quaking soak to the south. Downy Birch (Betula pubescens), Gorse (Ulex europaeus), Purple Moor-grass (Molinia caerulea), and Soft Rush (Juncus effusus) are recorded to the north-east of the site at cutover areas.

The pitcher plant Sarracenia purpurea has been recorded at Mouds Bog. Two plants of this species were transferred from Termonbarry Bog to Mouds Bog in 1963, and on sampling in 1989 the plants were thriving.

=== Fauna ===
The rare Red List species Red Grouse (Lagopus lagopus scotica) has been recorded at this site, as have Curlew (genus Numenius), Kestrel (genus Falco), Meadow Pipit (Anthus pratensis) and Skylark (Alauda arvensis).

Funding from the Heritage Council (along with other sources) allowed for the commencement of a three-year project to halt the decline of the Curlew at Mouds Bog and four other sites in 2016.

== Conservation Objectives ==
The conservation objectives for this site, published in 2015, include restoration of the area of active raised bog to 105.8 hectares, restoration of the habitat area, variability and distribution, and restoration of water levels, bog moss cover, microtopographical features, and central ecotope, active flush, soaks, and bog woodland areas. The objectives also include maintenance of the high bog area, transitional areas, raised bog flora and fauna, air quality with respect to nitrogen deposition, and water quality with respect to hydrochemical measures.

A comprehensive restoration plan for Mouds Bog was published in 2022, which outlines the restoration measures to be carried out at the site. These include blocking of all remaining high drain bogs and of drains on cutover bogs, removal of trees, cell bunding and general site management. The drainage management plan is described, as well as the community benefits to be accrued from the actions.

=== Threats ===
It is noted in the NPWS site synopsis that the site includes considerable areas of cutover, that there is “extensive active industrial peat moss production in the western section of the remaining high bog”, that domestic turf cutting also occurs here, that some areas have been reclaimed for agriculture and that there has been damage due to burning. The topic of turf-cutting has been contentious in this area.

== Culture ==
The poem 'The Bog of Moods' by Paula Meehan may refer to this location.
