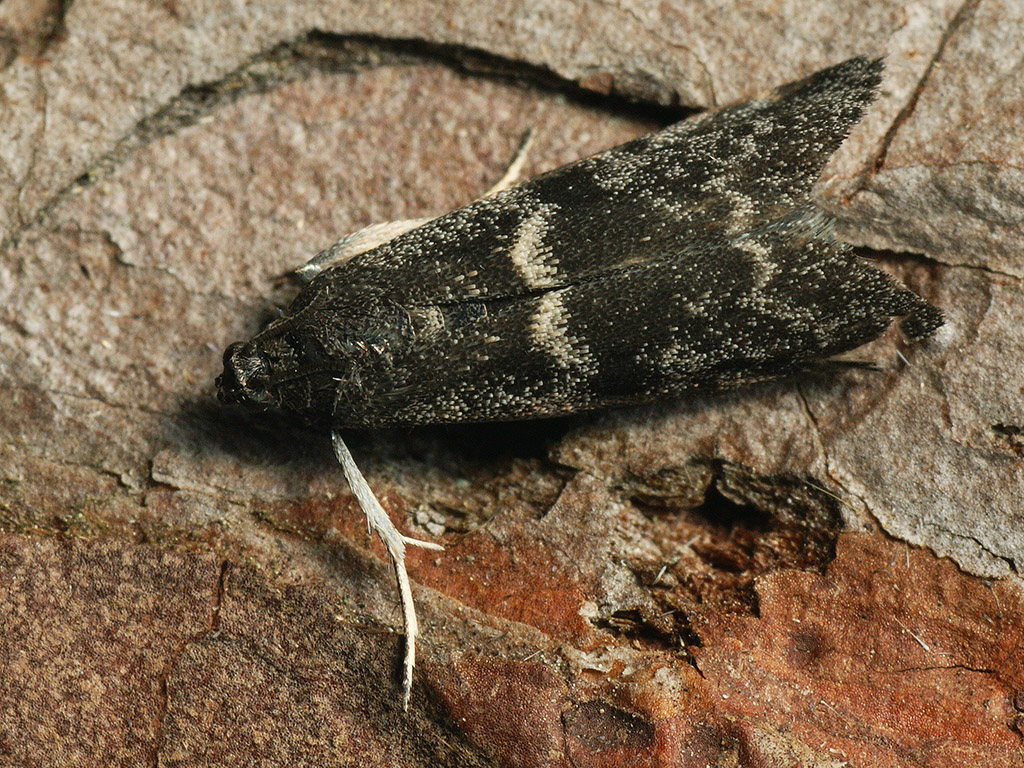

Scientific classification
- Domain: Eukaryota
- Kingdom: Animalia
- Phylum: Arthropoda
- Class: Insecta
- Order: Lepidoptera
- Family: Pyralidae
- Genus: Apomyelois
- Species: A. bistriatella

Binomial name
- Apomyelois bistriatella (Hulst, 1887)

Synonyms
- Myelois bistriatella Hulst, 1887; Dioryctria bistriatella; Myelois bilineatella Ragonot, 1887; Myelois neophanes Durrant, 1915; Myelois subcognata Ragonot, 1887

= Apomyelois bistriatella =

Species of moth

Apomyelois bistriatella is a species of snout moth in the genus Apomyelois. It was described by George Duryea Hulst in 1887. It is known from California, the eastern United States, northern Europe and Russia.

The wingspan is 15–25 mm. Adults are on wing from June to July.

The larvae feed on a fungus, Daldinia vernicosa, which grows on burnt gorse (Ulex species) and dead birch (Betula species). It has also been recorded feeding on Hypoxylon occidentale in California.

== Subspecies ==
- Apomyelois bistriatella bistriatella
- Apomyelois bistriatella subcognata (Ragonot, 1887)
