= Nikolay Grigoryevich Erschoff =

Russian entomologist (1837–1896)

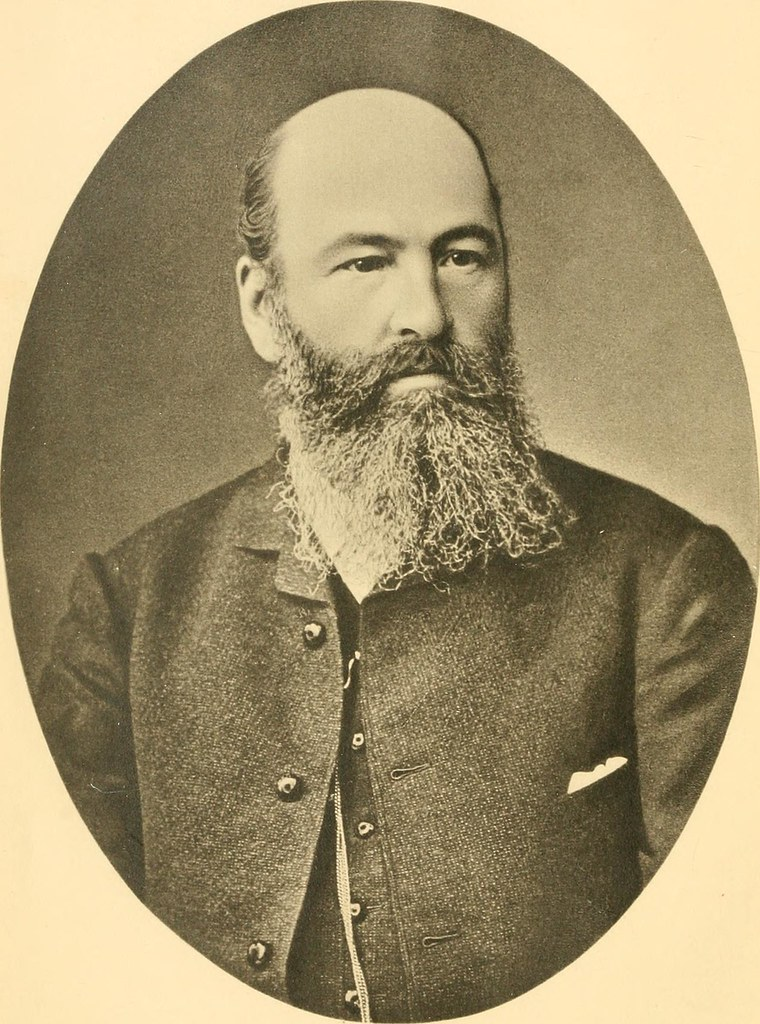
Nicolay Grigoryevich Erschoff in 1861

Nikolay Grigoryevich Erschoff, also Nikolaj Grigor'jevitsch Erschov, Erschow or Yershov (Russian: Николай Григорьевич Ершов; 23 April 1837 in Moscow – 12 March 1896 in Saint Petersburg) was a Russian entomologist mainly interested in Lepidoptera.

He received his secondary education in St. Petersburg, then, at the request of his father he remained a merchant, but attended lectures on zoology and chemistry at the Medico-Surgical Academy and worked at the Zoological Museum of the Imperial Academy of Sciences . While still at the boarding school, under the guidance of Édouard Ménétries, he studied mainly Russian Lepidoptera . Erschff assembled one of the best collections of butterflies, most of which he brought as a gift to the Zoological Museum of the Imperial Academy of Sciences and is currently stored at the Zoological Institute of the Russian Academy of Sciences in St. Petersburg. Ershov took an active part in the affairs of the Russian Entomological Society.

== Selected works ==
- 1868. Für die St.-Petersburger Fauna neue Schmetterlinge. Тр. Рус. энтомол. о-ва, т. 5, с. 97–99.
- 1872. Diagnoses de quelques especes nouvelles de Lépidoptères appartenant a la faune de la Russie Asiatique. Horae Societatis Entomologicae Rossicae. 8: 315–318.
- as Erschow, N.G. 1874. Lepidopteren von Turkestan. Stettiner Entomologische Zeitung, 35: 386–417.
- 1877. Diagnosen neuer Lepidopteren aus den verschiedenen Provinzen des Russischen Reiches. Horae Societatis Entomologicae Rossicae 12: 336–348.
- 1885. Verzeichniss von Schmetterlingen aus Central Sibirien. Mémoires sur les Lépidoptères, 2: 208–211.
- 1892. Verzeichniss von Schmetterlingen aus Central Sibirien. Mémoires sur les Lépidoptères, VI: 670–672, pl. XVI.

== Collection ==
Erschoff's insect collection is in the Zoological Collection of the Russian Academy of Science.
