= Church of Our Lady and St Joseph, Prosperous =

Church of Our Lady and Saint Joseph
- Teampall Mhuire agus Naomh Sheosaimh, An Chorrchoill
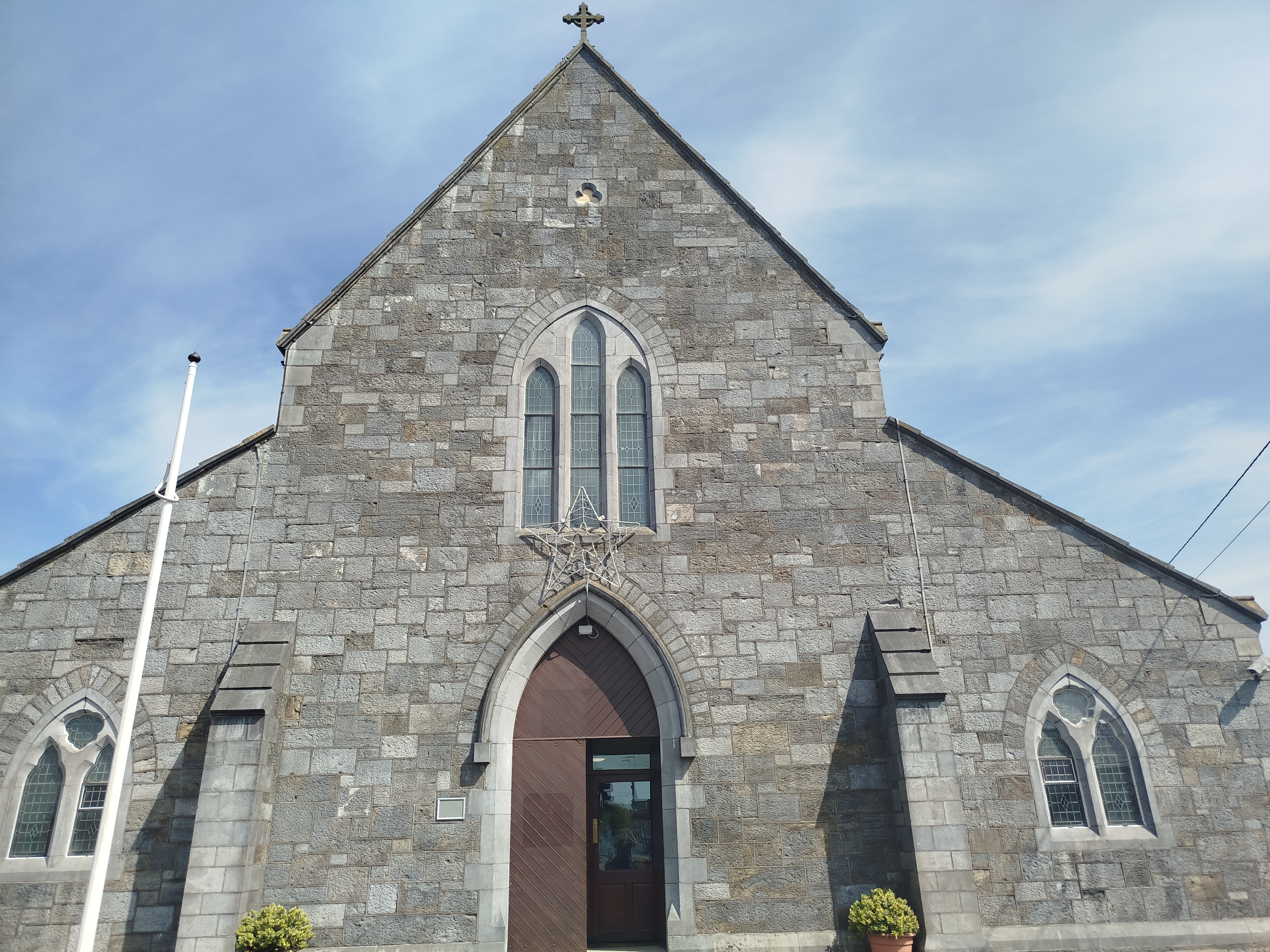
- West facade

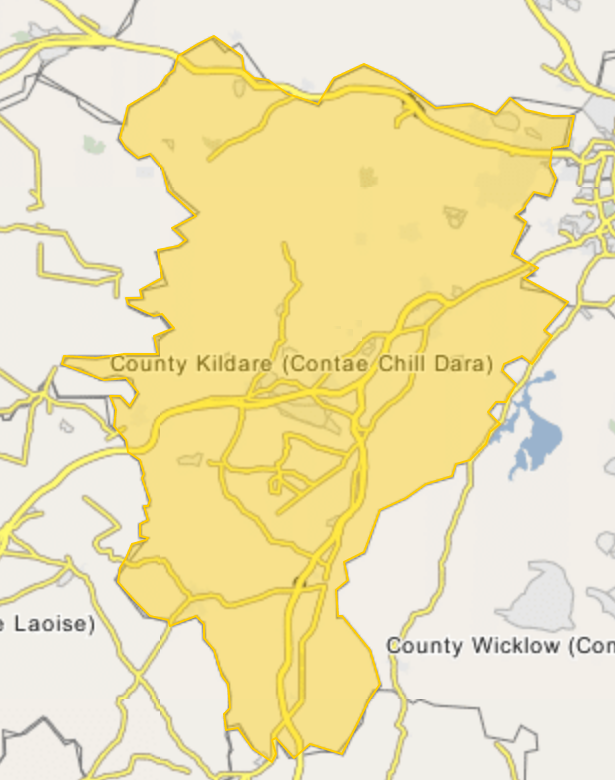
- Location within County Kildare Location within Ireland
- 53°17′18″N 6°45′06″W
- Location: Curryhills, Prosperous, County Kildare
- Country: Ireland
- Language: English
- Denomination: Catholic
- Churchmanship: Roman Rite
- Website: prosperousparish.net

History
- Dedication: Mary and Joseph

Architecture
- Functional status: Active
- Style: Gothic Revival
- Groundbreaking: 1866
- Completed: 1869

Specifications
- Length: 27 m (89 ft)
- Width: 18 m (59 ft)
- Materials: Limestone, cast iron, clay, slate, stained glass, granite

Administration
- Diocese: Kildare and Leighlin
- Deanery: Naas
- Parish: Newbridge, Caragh and Prosperous

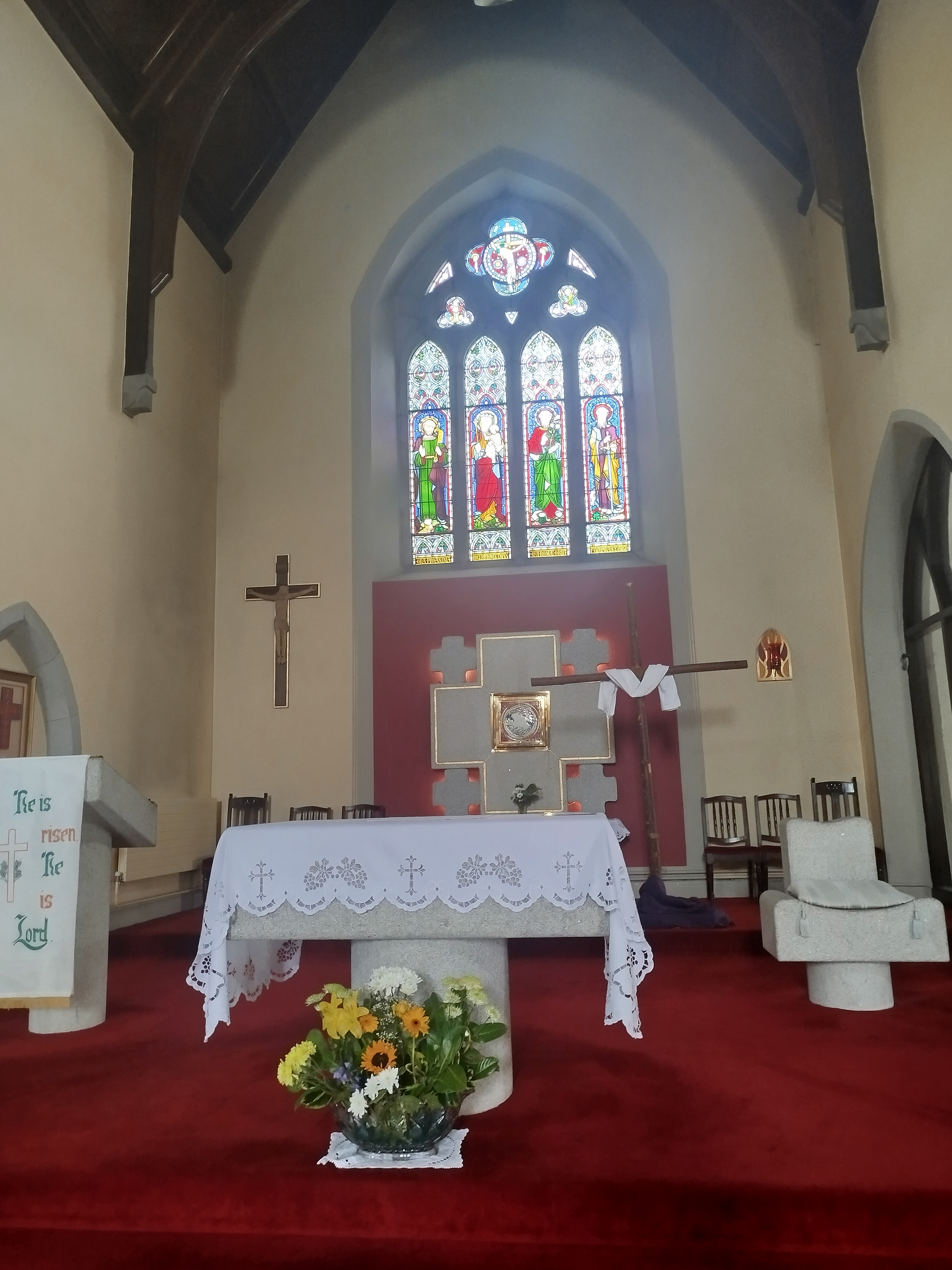
Altar and apse

The Church of Our Lady and Saint Joseph is a 19th-century Catholic church in Prosperous, County Kildare, Ireland.

== Location ==
Prosperous Church is located in the east of Prosperous village, on the crossroads on the R403 road to Clane.

== History ==
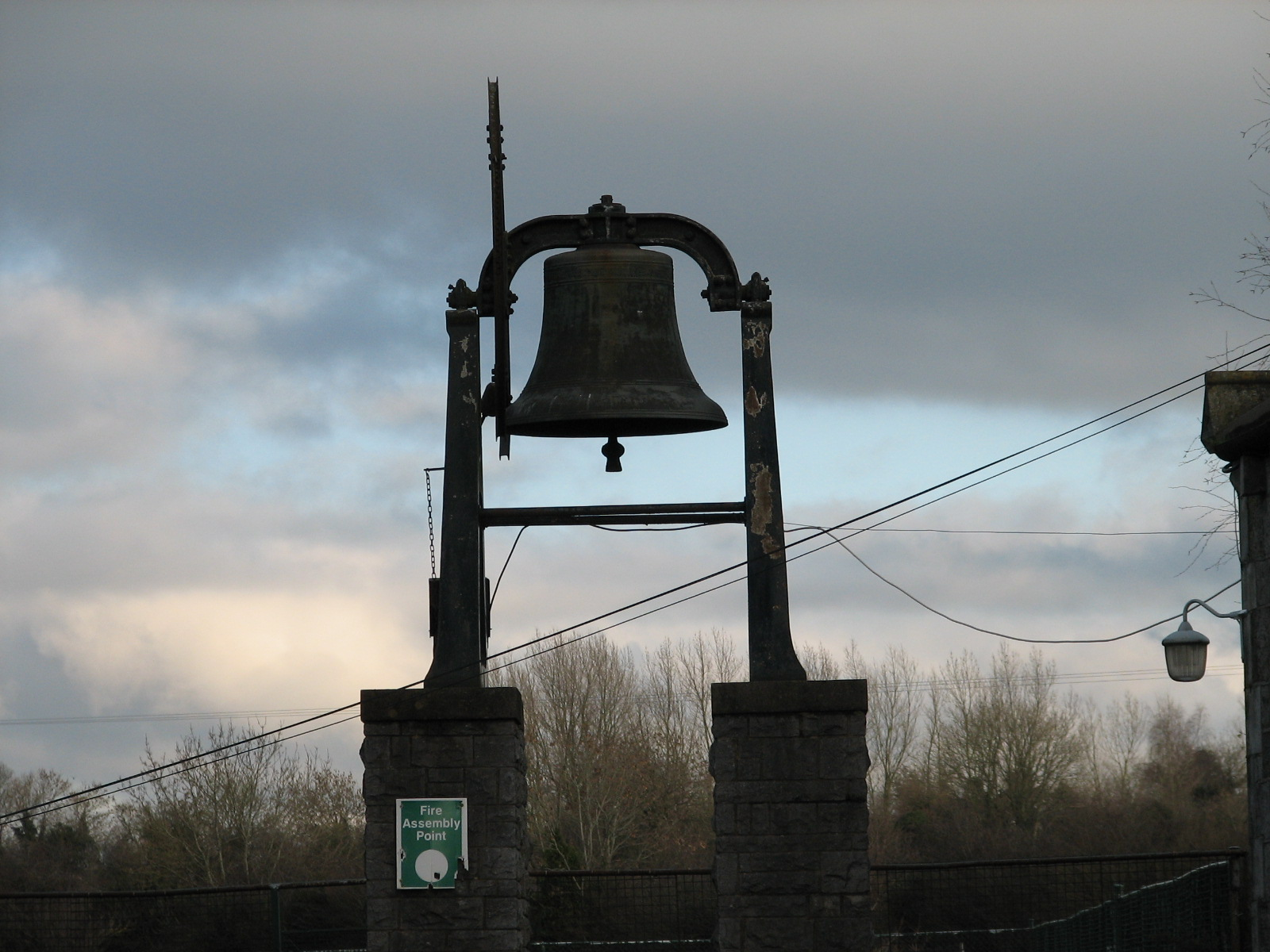
Freestanding church bell (1927)

The first church in the Prosperous area was at Downings North. A crozier was deposited or hidden in a bog near Prosperous c. AD 1000 and was found by turf-cutters around 1831; it is now in the National Museum of Ireland – Archaeology. There is a ruined church at Killybegs, associated with the Knights Hospitaller — the current Church of Our Lady and Saint Joseph contains a baptismal font from the Killybegs church. In the Penal era, there was a Mass-house in the townland of Goatstown. When the modern village was erected by Robert Brooke in the late 18th/early 19th centuries, a Catholic chapel was located at the site of the Prosperous Dramatic Society. Ballynafagh Church, 3 km to the north, was the Church of Ireland site of worship until 1959.

The Church of Our Lady and Saint Joseph was built in 1866–69 in a Gothic Revival style and dedicated to Mary and Joseph. It has a four-bay double-height nave with four-bay single-storey lean-to side aisles to the north-west and to south-east, and a single-bay double-height lower chancel to the north-east.

The bell was added in 1927. The church building was extended in 1985, adding a sacristy.
