= Coill Dubh =

Village in County Kildare, Ireland

- Village
- Location in Ireland
- Coordinates: 53°17′32″N 6°49′03″W
- Country: Ireland
- Province: Leinster
- County: County Kildare

Population (2022)
  - Total: 1,476
- Time zone: UTC+0 (WET)
  - Summer (DST): UTC-1 (IST (WEST))

Historical population
Year	Pop.	±%
1961	645	—
1966	786	+21.9%
1971	920	+17.0%
1981	876	−4.8%
1986	772	−11.9%
1991	693	−10.2%
1996	682	−1.6%
2002	592	−13.2%
2006	684	+15.5%
2011	693	+1.3%
2016	746	+7.6%
2022	1,476	+97.9%

Coill Dubh (Irish pronunciation: [ˌkəil̠ʲ ˈd̪ˠʊw]; meaning "black wood"), also sometimes known as Blackwood, is a village in northern County Kildare in Ireland. It is located at the junction of the R403 and R408 regional roads, about 40 km (25 mi) from Dublin. Developed as a planned town in the 1950s to accommodate Bord na Móna employees working in the area, it was one of the fastest growing urban areas in Ireland between the 2016 and 2022 census, with its population doubling from 746 to 1,476.

== History ==
The village was established in 1952, on the townland of Blackwood (Coill Dubh or Coill na Cúirte in Irish) just off the R403 between Prosperous and Timahoe, to accommodate workers on the Bord na Mona works supplying a peat fired power station in Allenwood. It replaced earlier temporary workers camps at Killinthomas, Mucklon and Timahoe, with 160 houses and several shops. Developed alongside nearby Cooleragh, it was the only large settlement to have been founded in County Kildare during the 20th century.

Responsibility for the maintenance of a number of housing developments in the village transferred to Kildare County Council in 2017. Coill Dubh was classified as a "village" in Kildare County Council's 2023-2029 Development Plan.

== Sport ==
The village is home to Coill Dubh GAA club which, as of 2015, had won the Kildare Senior Hurling Championship eleven times. The local association football (soccer) club, Coill Dubh AFC, was founded in 1978.

== See also ==
- List of towns and villages in Ireland

== Bibliography ==
- Denneny, Owen; Egan, Liam; Pollard, Patience; Creavin, Ted; Holton, Liam; Byrne, Paddy; Flaherty, Andy; Saunders, Aileen; Clohessy, John (2006), Historical Paths Revisited, Timahoe Historical Society
