= Stickens =

- Townland
- Location in Ireland
- Coordinates: 53°14′13″N 6°43′29″W
- Country: Ireland
- Province: Leinster
- County: County Kildare
- Elevation: 118 m (387 ft)

Population (est.)
  - Urban: 100
- Time zone: UTC+0 (WET)
  - Summer (DST): UTC-1 (IST (WEST))

Stickens is a townland in the Roman Catholic parish of Caragh in County Kildare, Ireland. It is part of the Donore Electoral Division.

Stickens is located a quarter of a mile past the village of Caragh when travelling north-west on the R409. The townland is situated to the left of the road, and is accessed by a cul de sac which is entered onto by taking the first left turn having travelled past the church in Caragh village.

On some historical records the spelling "Stickins" appears; however, this version is infrequently used. There is debate regarding the origin of the name of the townland. One possible source is the old English word "stoc" which means wooden defence.
