= R405 road (Ireland) =

Road in Ireland

Coordinates: 53.355602°N 6.547081°W

R405 road
- Bóthar R405
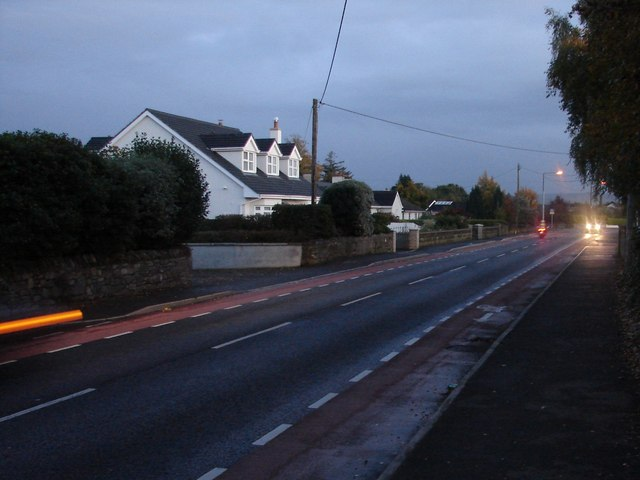
- Maynooth Road, Celbridge, part of the R405

Route information
- Length: 5.8 km (3.6 mi)

Major junctions
- From: R406 Maynooth
- Passes over M4; R449 Crodaun; R403 Celbridge; Crosses River Liffey; Crosses Dublin–Waterford railway line and enters South Dublin; Crosses Grand Canal at Hazelhatch
- To: R120 Newcastle

Location
- Country: Ireland

Highway system
- Roads in Ireland; Motorways; Primary; Secondary; Regional

The R405 road is a regional road in Ireland, located in County Dublin and County Kildare.
