= Governor Brooke =

Governor Brooke may refer to:

- John R. Brooke (1838–1926), Military Governor of Puerto Rico in 1898 and Military Governor of Cuba in 1899
- Robert Brooke (East India Company officer) (1744–1811), Governor of the island of St Helena from 1788 to 1800
- Robert Brooke Sr. (1602–1655), Colonial Governor of Maryland for several months in 1652
- Thomas Brooke Jr. (1659–1730s), Acting Proprietary Governor of the Province of Maryland in 1720
