= R408 road (Ireland) =

Road in Ireland

Coordinates: 53.298215°N 6.738823°W

R408 road
- Bóthar R408
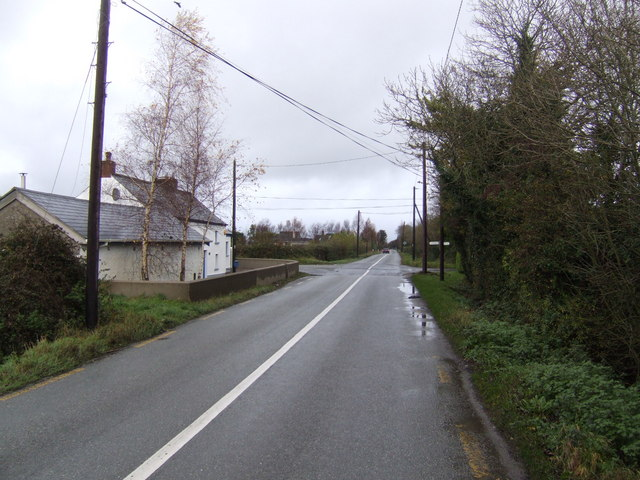
- Betaghstown crossroads, looking southwest on the R408.

Route information
- Length: 12.3 km (7.6 mi)

Major junctions
- From: R403 Prosperous
- R407 Boherhole; Passes through Rathcoffey
- To: R148 Maynooth

Location
- Country: Ireland

Highway system
- Roads in Ireland; Motorways; Primary; Secondary; Regional

The R408 road is a regional road in Ireland, located in County Kildare.
