= R449 road (Ireland) =

Road in Ireland

R449 road
- Bóthar R449
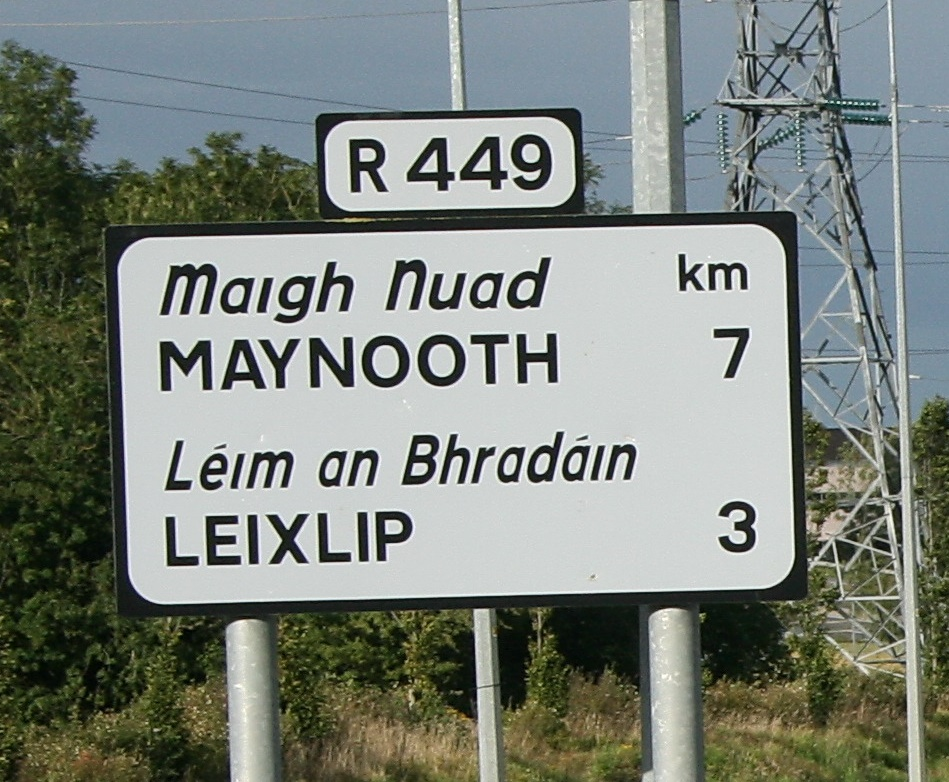

Route information
- Length: 2.9 km (1.8 mi)

Major junctions
- From: R148 Collinstown
- M4 Junction 6
- To: R405 Crodaun

Location
- Country: Ireland

Highway system
- Roads in Ireland; Motorways; Primary; Secondary; Regional

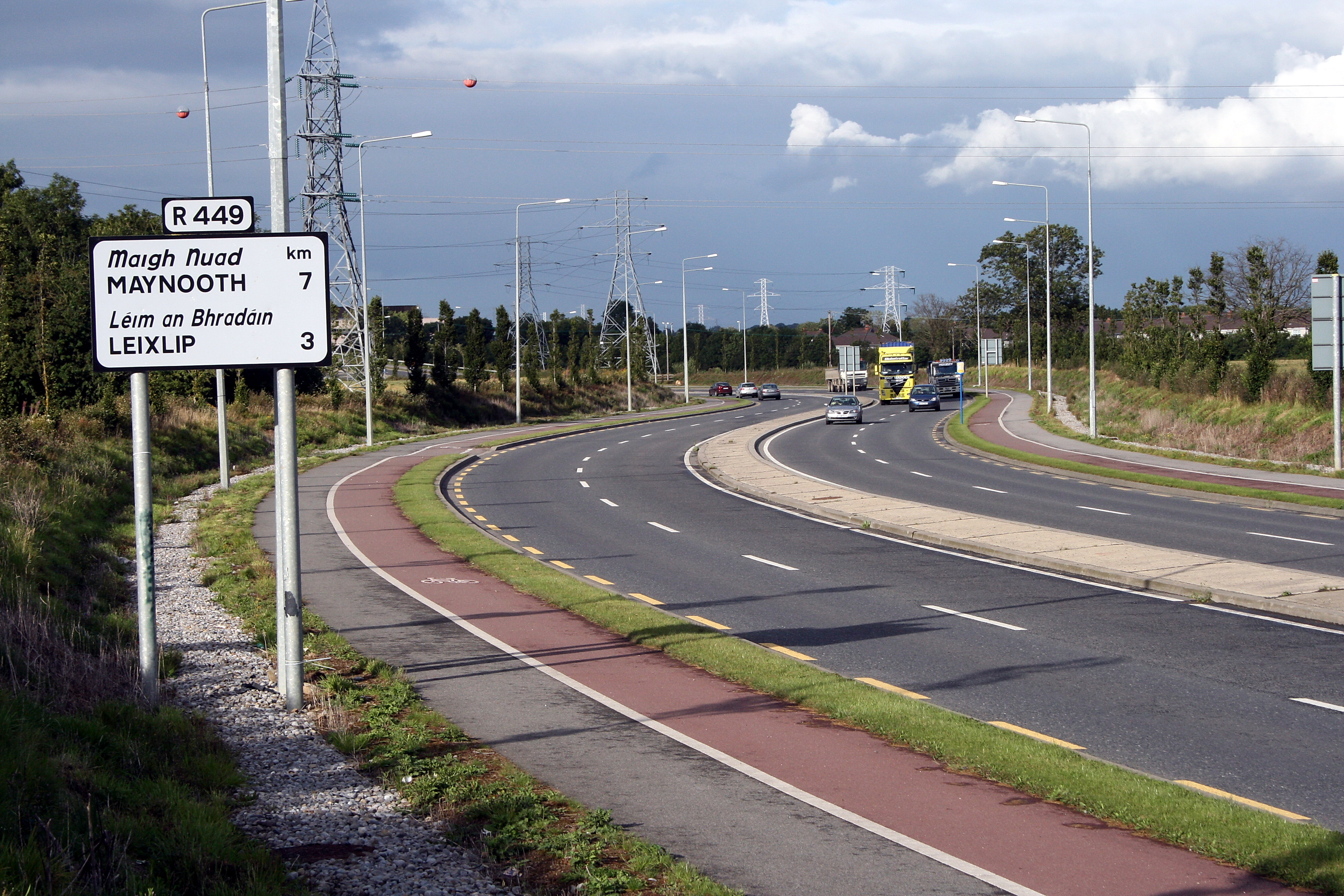
R449 northbound

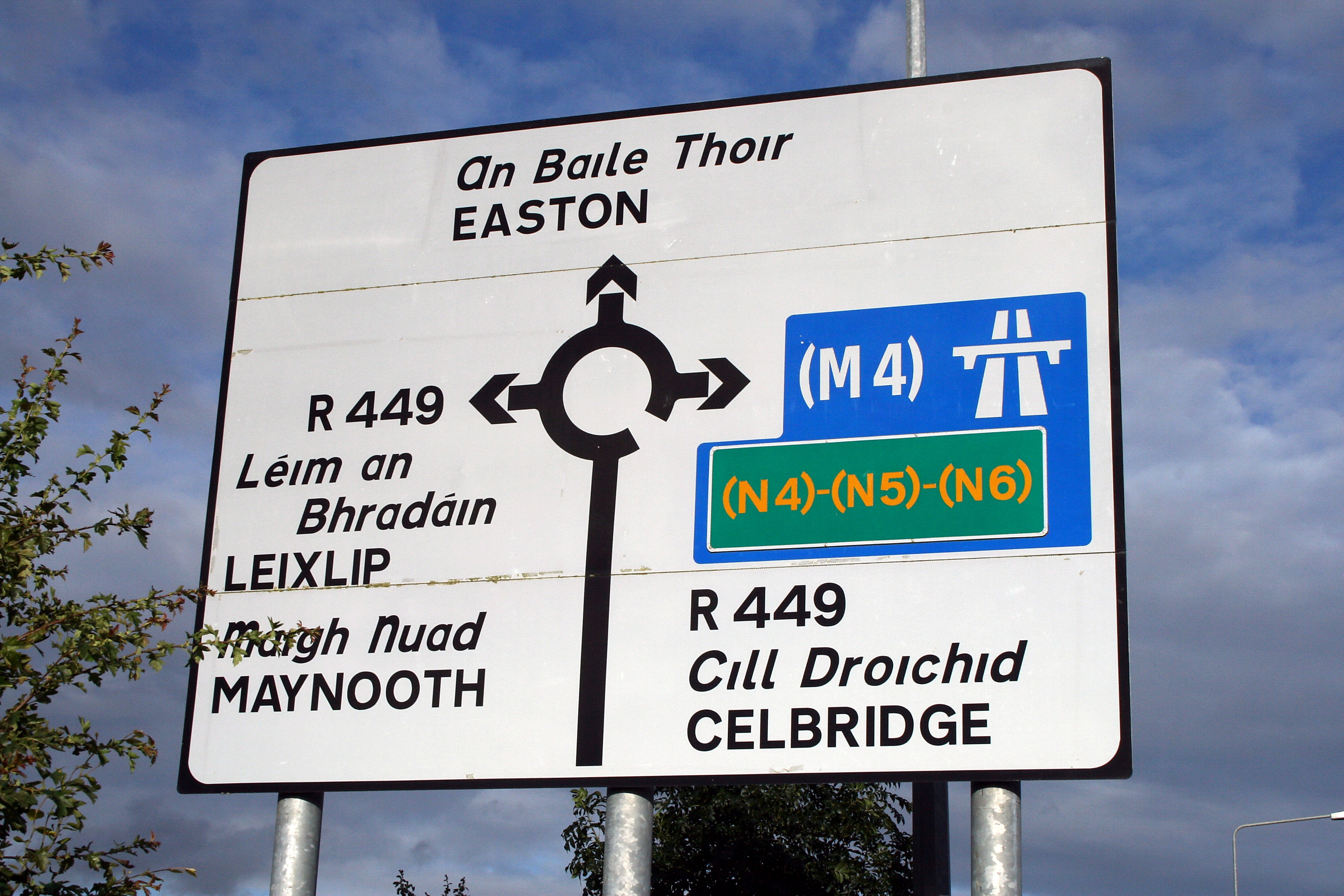

The R449 road is a regional road in County Kildare, Ireland. It is just 3 km (1.9 mi) long and was completed in 2003 as part of the construction of a grade separated interchange to connect both west Leixlip and north Celbridge to the M4 motorway at Junction 6.

The 2 km section between Leixlip and the M4 is dual-carriageway. The speed limit along this section is 60 km/h, despite joining an 80 km/h road with 120 km/h road, via a dual carriageway.

The road crosses the Dublin-Sligo railway line and the Royal Canal. The bridge on which it crosses collapsed during construction, blocking the railway line for a time.

From north to south the road leaves the R148 regional road (formerly the N4 national primary road until the opening of the M4), crosses the M4 and terminates at the R405 north of Celbridge.

== See also ==
- Roads in Ireland
- National primary road
- National secondary road
