= Weston Airport =

General aviation facility near Dublin, Ireland

Weston Airport Aerfort Weston
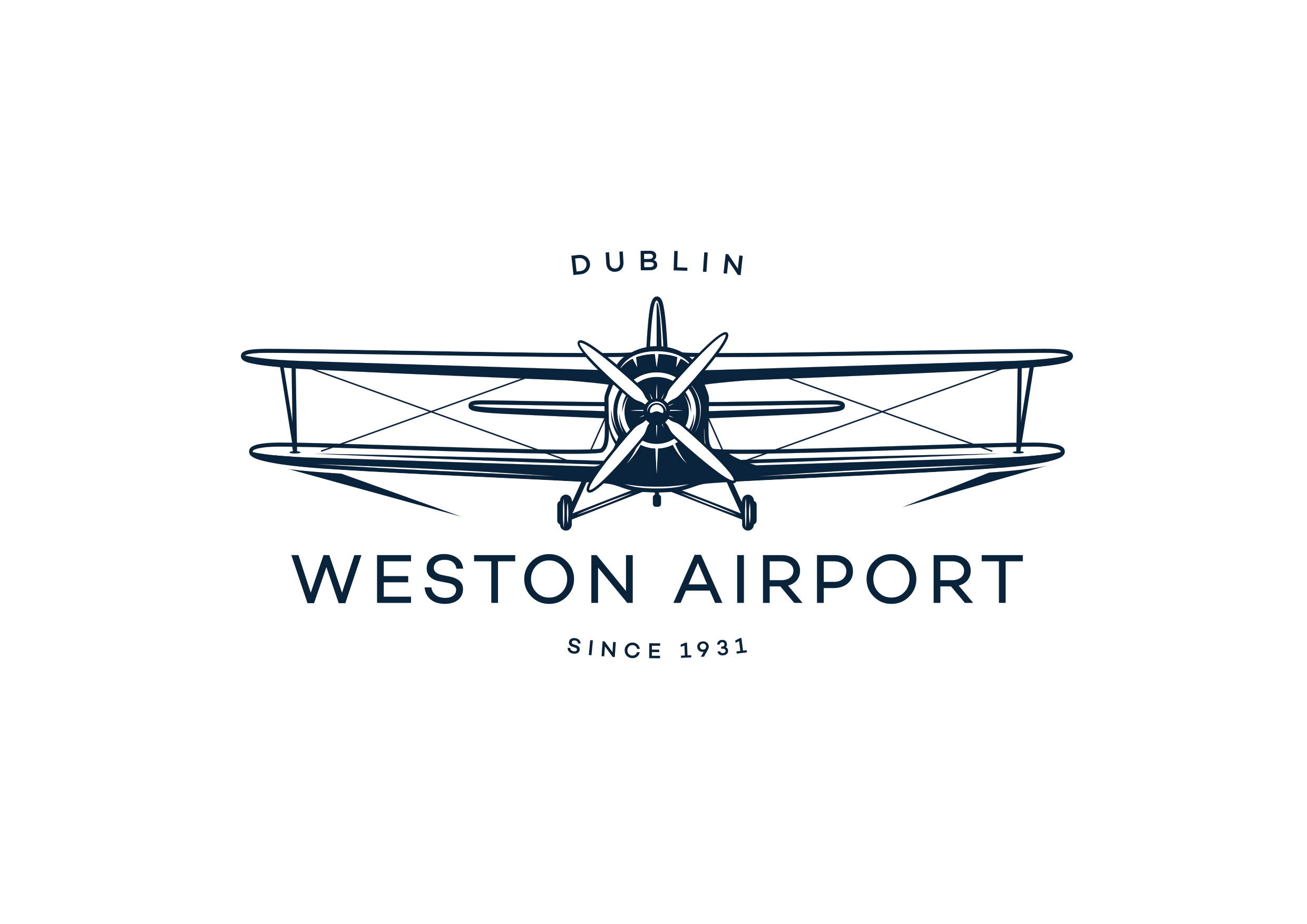

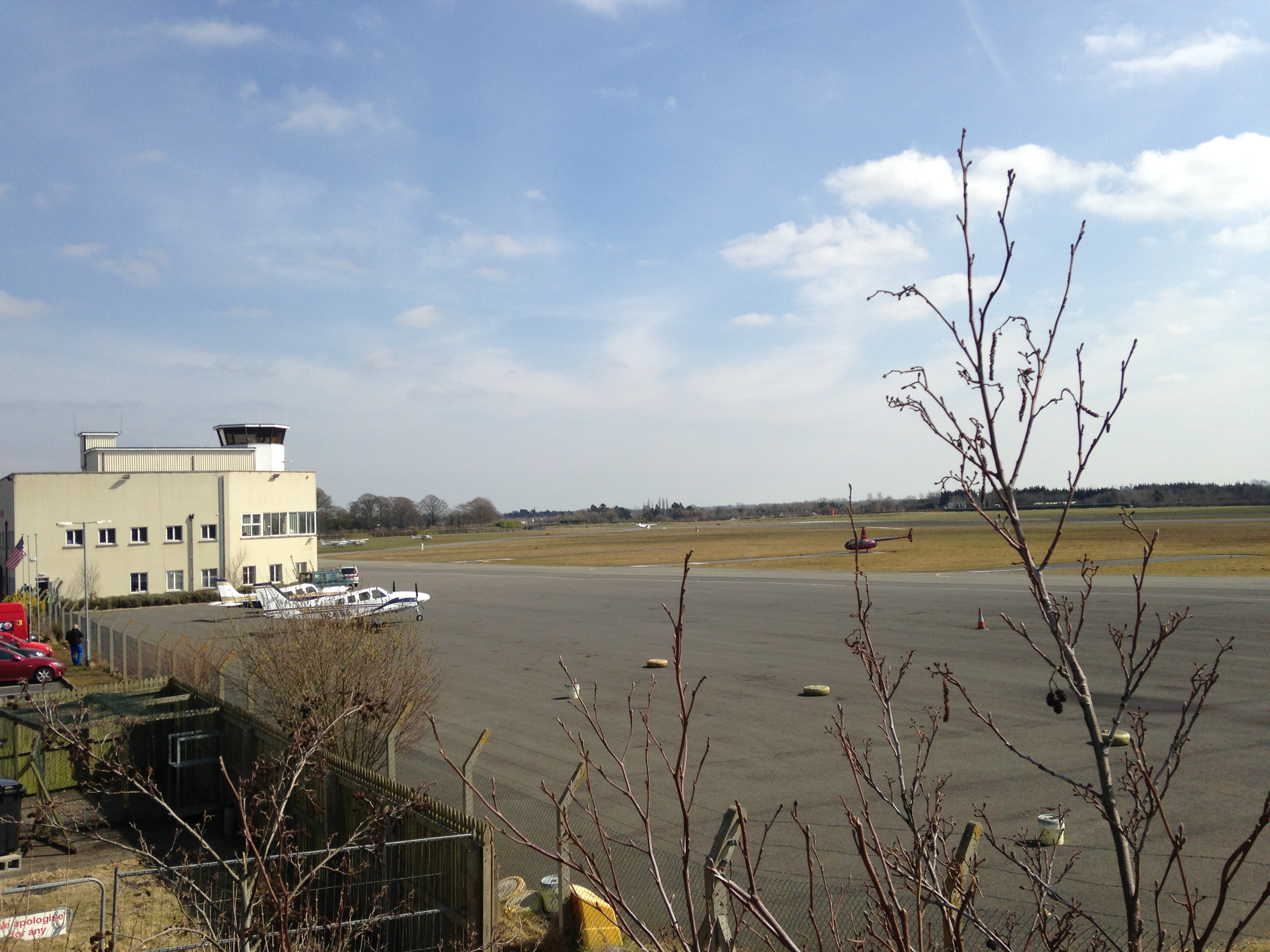
- IATA: none; ICAO: EIWT

Summary
- Airport type: Public
- Owner: Private investors
- Operator: Weston Airport Ltd.
- Serves: Dublin
- Location: Leixlip, County Kildare / Lucan, Dublin
- Time zone: GMT (UTC±00:00)
  - Summer (DST): IST (UTC+01:00)
- Elevation AMSL: 155 ft / 47 m
- Coordinates: 53°21′08″N 6°29′18″W
- Website: westonairport.ie

Map
- Location of Weston Airport, west of Dublin Location of Weston Airport in Ireland

Runways
Direction	Length		Surface
Direction	m	ft	Surface
07/25	924 + Stopway 457 = 1,381	3,030	Asphalt
- Source: Irish AIS

Weston Airport, also called Dublin Weston Airport, is a publicly licensed general aviation (GA) airport serving Dublin and its environs since the early 1930s. It is located, between Lucan in Dublin and Leixlip in County Kildare, approximately 8 NM (15 km; 9.2 mi) west of Dublin city. Its traffic is primarily private and commercial flight training as well as business/executive travel. It is the only general aviation airport in the greater Dublin region, and is home to one of Ireland's two approved training organisations for ab-initio professional pilot training.

The runway lies across the border between counties Kildare and Dublin. The facility is located on the Dublin side of the line. The airport operator's mailing address is in Lucan.

== History ==
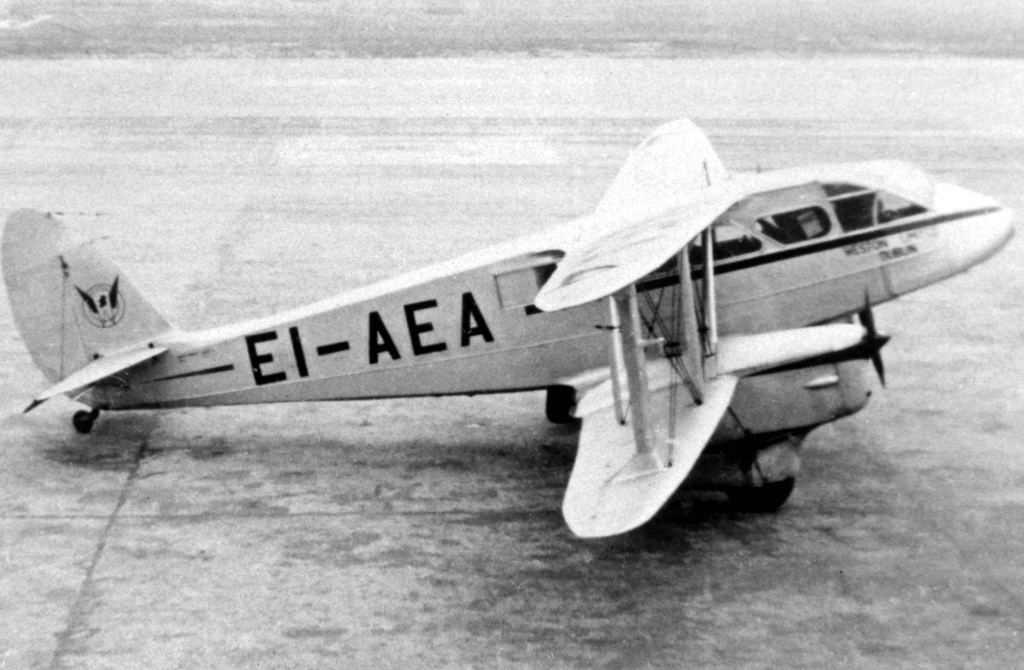
Weston Ltd De Havilland Dragon Rapide on a charter flight from Weston at Liverpool Airport in 1949

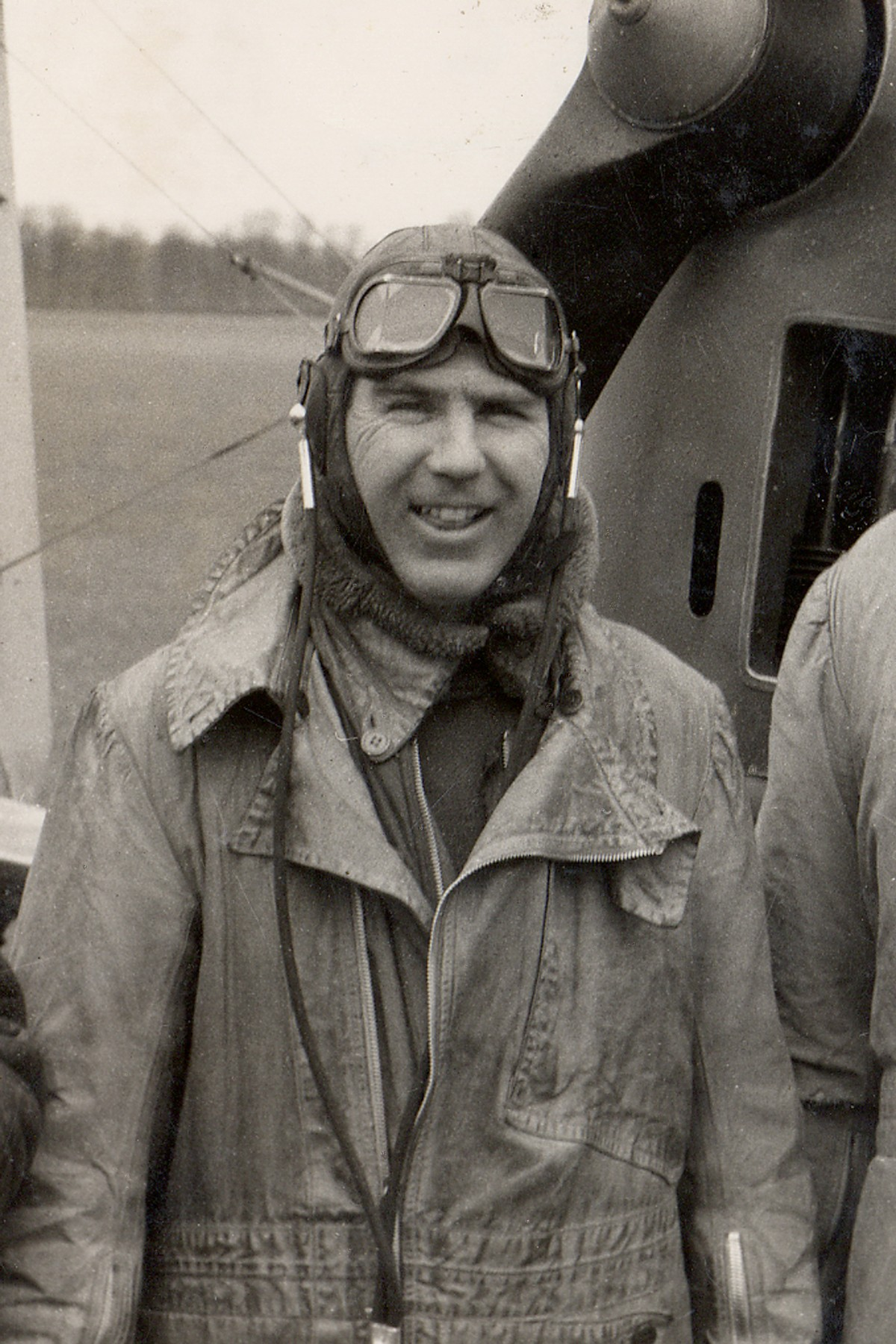
Darby Kennedy in 1956

Weston Aerodrome was founded in 1931 (licensed circa 1937) by Darby Kennedy (1915-2016) who, from 1946, operated a de Havilland Dragon and several Dragon Rapide aircraft commercially from the Weston flying field, operated under the name Weston Ltd. The charter flights took the biplane airliners to airfields in the United Kingdom. The commercial flight operation ceased in the late 1950s, and Weston Ltd continued as a training provider for private and commercial licences. Darby Kennedy was chief instructor and also became chief pilot of Aer Lingus, Ireland's flag-carrier airline.

In 1988, Kennedy was presented with a crystal memento by then Irish president Patrick Hillery, at a ceremony to celebrate the 50th anniversary of the founding of the airfield. During the event, which was recorded by RTÉ television, President Hillery took to the air in a replica of the de Havilland DH84 Dragon "Iolar" (Eagle) which flew Aer Lingus's first ever flight, from Dublin (Baldonnel) to Bristol in 1936.

Also operated from the airfield was a flying school, Leinster Aero Club for private pilots with several de Havilland Tiger Moth trainer biplanes, an Auster 5J/1 Autocrat high-wing monoplane and from 1960 two Morane-Saulnier-Rallye four-seater low-winged aeroplanes. The airport was upgraded from a grass runway in the 1980s when a tarmac runway was laid. The main terminal was completed in 2005 along with the control tower and other services.

In January 2014, then Transport Minister Leo Varadkar launched a new Coast Guard Sikorsky S92 helicopter for the East Coast region at Weston Airport. The airport owner announced it was in talks with Kildare and Dublin councils and local groups about providing a walk-way and park.

The airport is used as a staging point for aircraft displaying in the annual Bray Air Display.

In late 2023, as part of a joint Revenue Customs and Garda Drugs and Organised Crime Bureau operation, €8m worth of heroin was seized from a private aircraft at the airport.

== Ownership ==
The airport was acquired in 2000 and developed by Jim Mansfield. It was taken over by the National Asset Management Agency (NAMA) in 2011. In 2013, the airport was sold by NAMA to Brian Conneely and Co., who announced plans to "upgrade the radar system and buildings, with a focus on aviation education courses". Conneely and Co said they were hopeful the sale would "mark a turning point" in Irish aviation and said that they were "delighted" with the purchase due to its "proud tradition in Irish aviation".

In August 2021, it was announced that a group of investors, which included tech entrepreneur and aviation enthusiast John Collison, had bought a majority stake in Weston Airport. Final sale to this group was confirmed later in 2021 and the new co-owners subsequently applied for planning permission for additional upgrade works on the site.

== Popular culture ==
Several air displays have been held at the airport, and in 1966 Weston was used in filming the World War I air combat film, The Blue Max. The aircraft ground scenes were shot at the airfield. It was also used for filming 1971's "Von Richthofen and Brown": Richard Bach, author of Jonathan Livingstone Seagull, was one of the film's stunt pilots, and wrote about some of his experiences at Weston during its production.

In 2018, author Bob Montgomery published In Weston Skies: A personal memoir of flying at Weston in the 1950s, a book which covers his father's role in Irish private aviation in the post-war era.

== Location and facilities ==
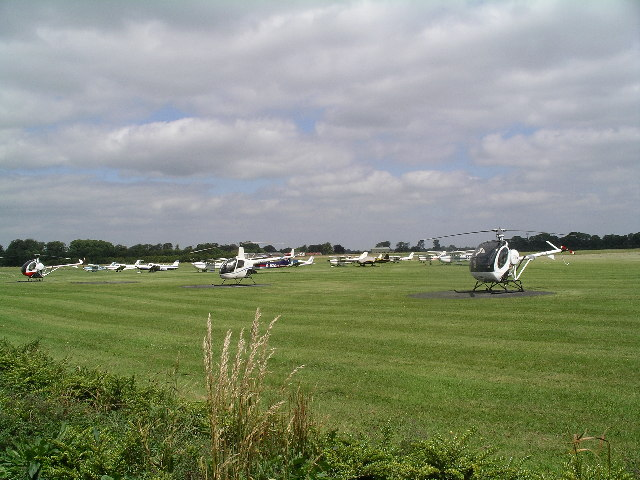
Aircraft at Weston Airport in 2003

The airport lies between Celbridge and Lucan, just off Exit 5 on the M4 motorway, on the R403 regional road. It is located on approximately 250 acres (1.0 km^{2}) of land and incorporates about 9,000 m^{2} (97,000 sq ft) of operations buildings, coffee shop, executive terminal, an air traffic control tower, and three large aircraft hangars. As of 2025, a fourth hangar was under construction.

Straddling the border between counties Dublin and Kildare, the airport lies predominantly within South Dublin County and is bordered to the north by the River Liffey and Leixlip Reservoir.

Irish aviation training infrastructure at the airport includes the National Flight Centre Pilot Academy (NFC), which maintains a fleet of Cessna 152, Cessna 172, Tecnam P-Mentor, and Tecnam P2006T fixed wing aircraft, and Robinson R44 helicopters. NFC also operates jet, fixed wing and helicopter simulators, and is both an Approved Training Organisation and an approved Air Operator.

It also hosts a maintenance and operational base for Bristow Helicopters who conduct search and rescue operations for the Irish Coast Guard.

The airport has also been headquarters to other training organisations, including Weston Ltd., Trim Flying Club, Leinster Flying Club, Hotel Bravo Flying Club, and Garda Siochana (Irish police) Aviation Club.
