= Derrinturn =

Village in County Kildare, Ireland

Derrinturn Doire an tSoirn
- Village
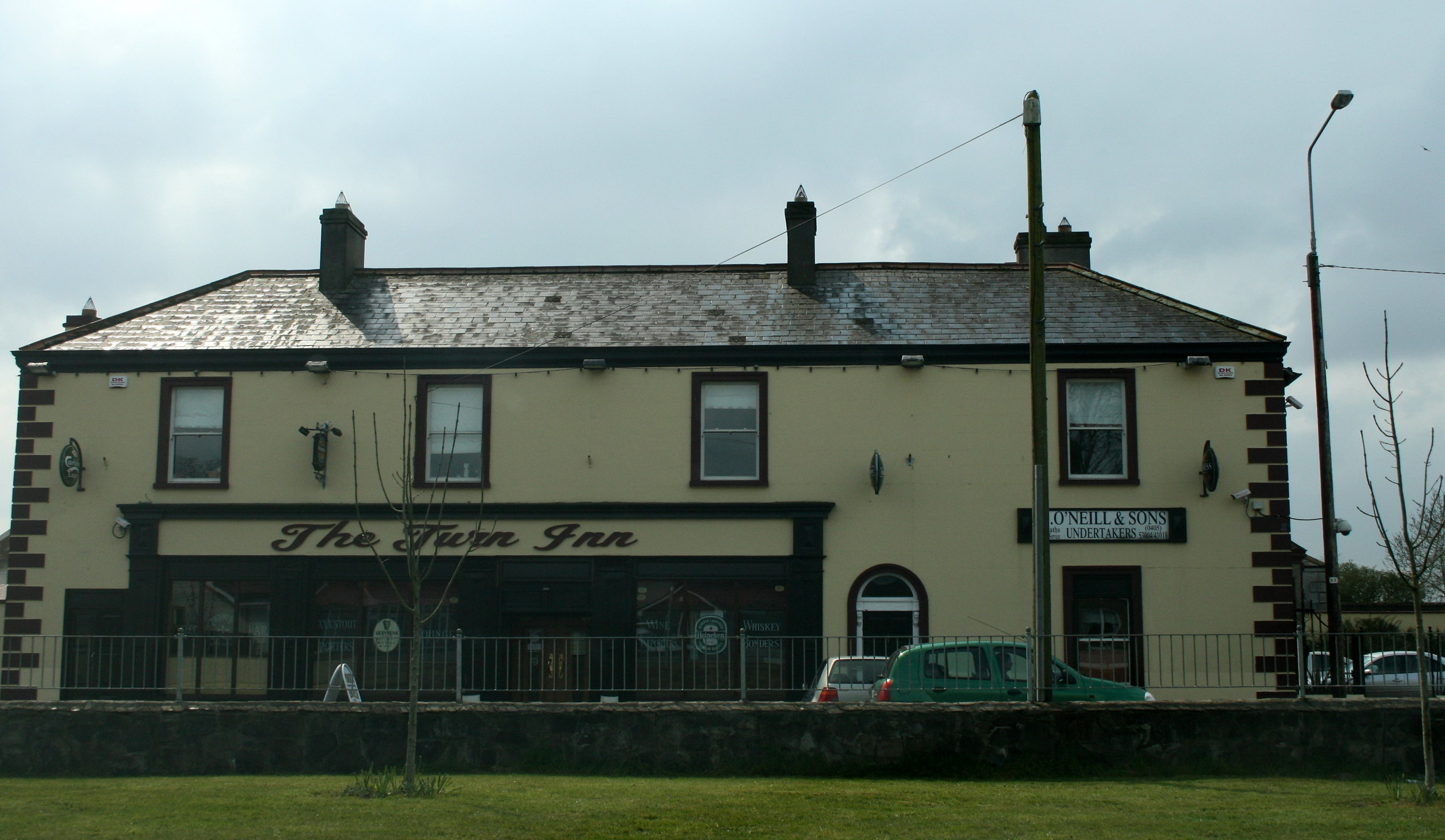
- The Turn Inn, Derrinturn

- Location in Ireland
- Coordinates: 53°20′23″N 6°56′24″W
- Country: Ireland
- Province: Leinster
- County: County Kildare

Area
  - Total: 2 km^{2} (0.77 sq mi)
- Elevation: 85 m (279 ft)

Population (2022)
  - Total: 1,837
  - Density: 920/km^{2} (2,400/sq mi)
- Time zone: UTC+0 (WET)
  - Summer (DST): UTC-1 (IST (WEST))
- Irish Grid Reference: N759266

Derrinturn (Irish: Doire an tSoirn, meaning 'oak wood of the furnace') is a village in County Kildare, Ireland. It is part of the parish of Carbury. It is located about 60 km (37 mi) from Dublin.

The main road through Derrinturn is the R403 regional road.

The population was 1,837 as of the 2022 census, an increase of 1000% from 1961 when only 183 people lived in the village.

Derrinturn has one Roman Catholic church and a primary school St. Conleth's (Naomh Connlaodh).

Derrinturn townland has an area of 132.40 hectares (327.2 acres). It borders the townlands of Ballyhagan to the west, Ballyshannon to the east, Coonagh to the east, Dreenan to the south, Newbury Demesne to the north, and Rathmore to the south.

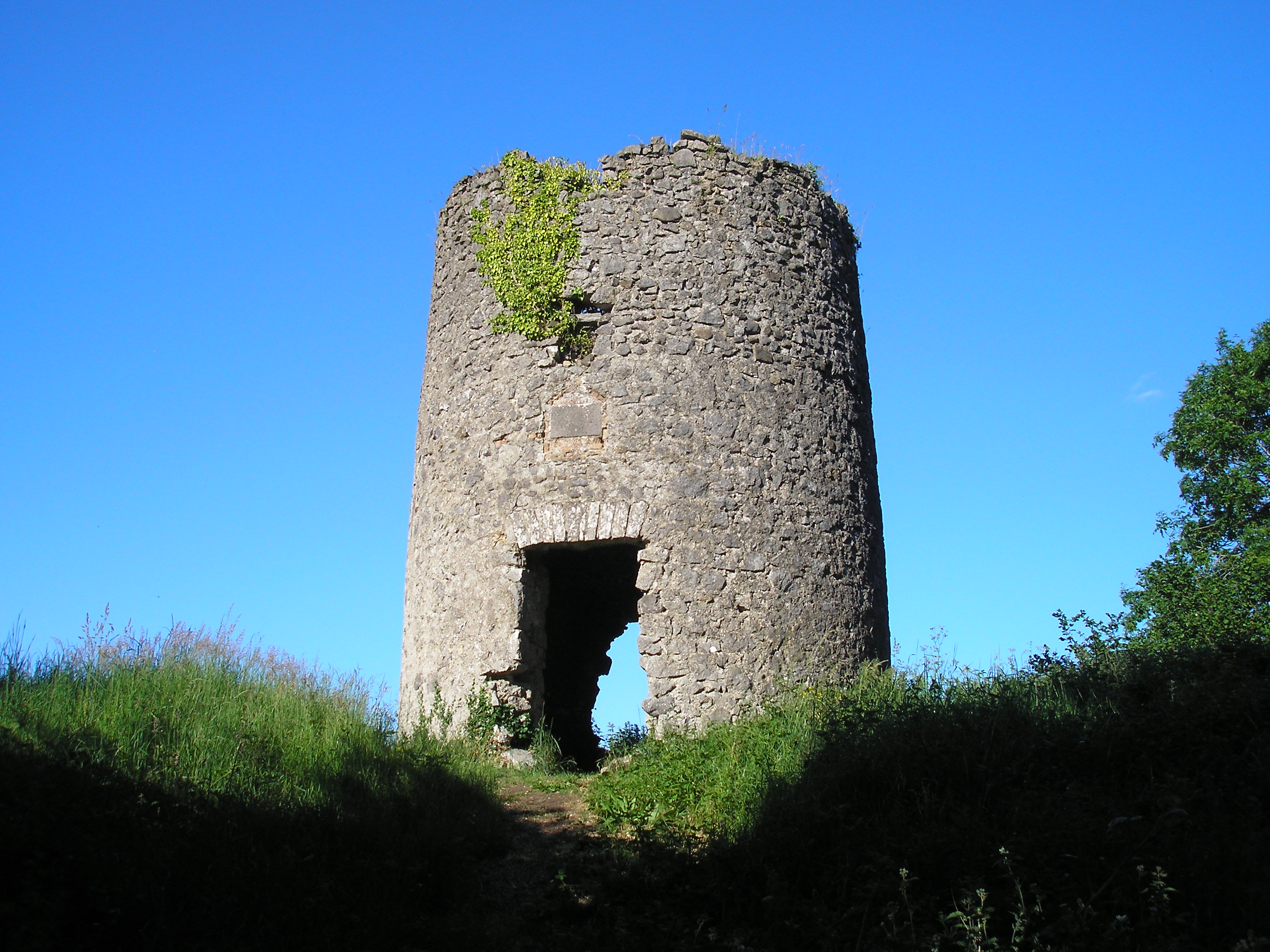
The Windmill, Derrinturn

== See also ==
Historical population
Year	Pop.	±%
1961	183	—
1966	176	−3.8%
1981	395	+124.4%
1986	528	+33.7%
1991	553	+4.7%
1996	544	−1.6%
2002	799	+46.9%
2006	1,138	+42.4%
2011	1,541	+35.4%
2016	1,602	+4.0%
2022	1,837	+14.7%

- List of towns and villages in Ireland
