= Mullen Bridge =

Coordinates: 58°22′43.3″N 6°35′18.2″W

Mullen Bridge is an old bridge crossing the Royal Canal in Maynooth in County Kildare, Ireland. It was built between 1790 and 1800.

The bridge used to carry the main R406 road leading south out of the town across the canal and a railway line. In the late 1980s/early 1990s a new bridge was built alongside it to cater for the increased traffic on the route. The old bridge was left standing after the works were complete, although the newer, second arch over the railway line was removed due to space constraints. It would also have been too low to allow electrification of the train line below without the line being dug down.
