= Prosperous, County Kildare =

Town in County Kildare, Ireland

Prosperous Irish: An Chorrchoill
- Town
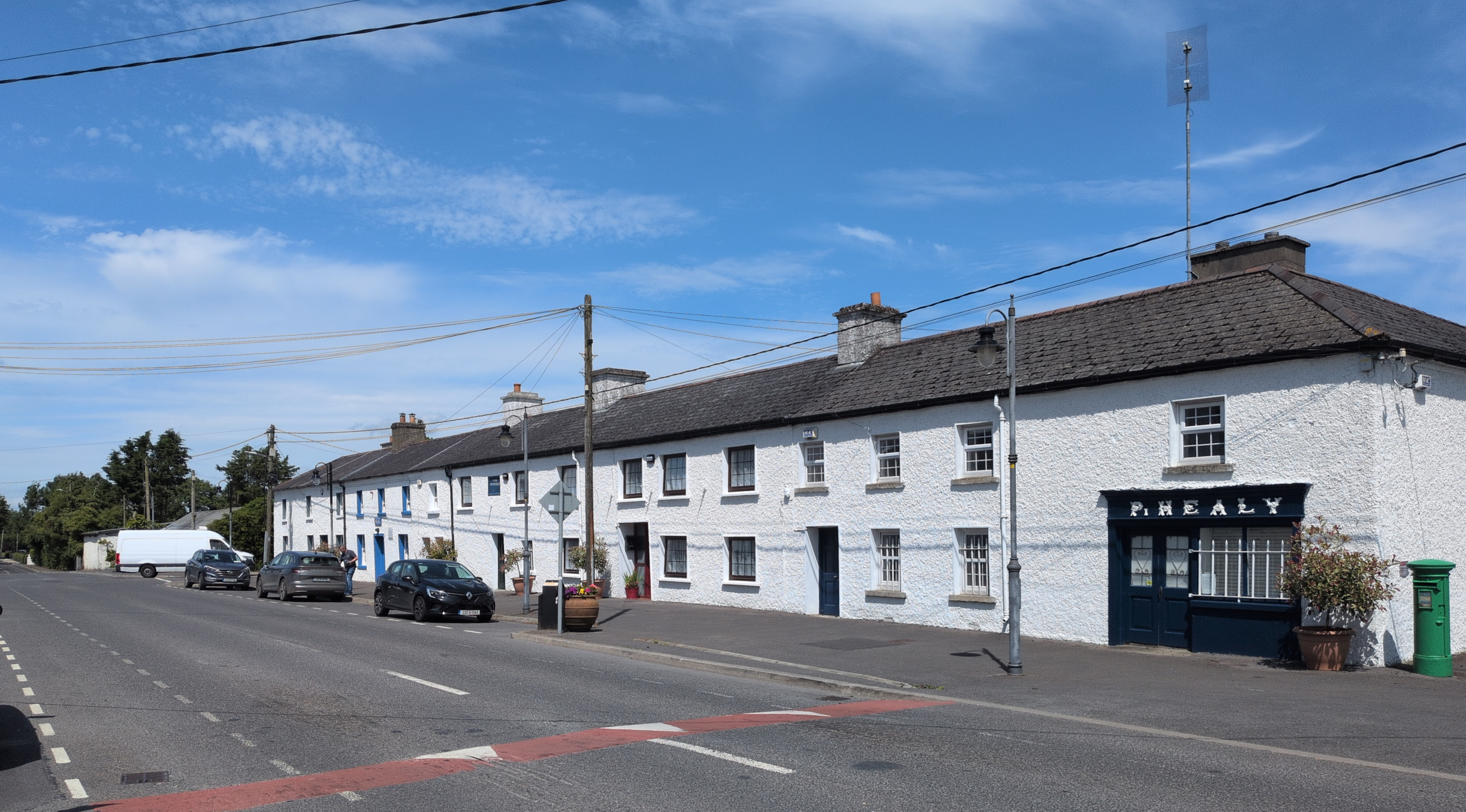
- R408 through town centre

- Location in Ireland
- Coordinates: 53°17′18″N 6°45′06″W
- Country: Ireland
- Province: Leinster
- County: County Kildare

Population (2022)
  - Total: 2,413
- Time zone: UTC+0 (WET)
  - Summer (DST): UTC-1 (IST (WEST))
- Irish Grid Reference: N827273

Prosperous (Irish: An Chorrchoill, meaning 'the smooth forest') is a town in north County Kildare, Ireland. It is within the townland of Curryhills, at the junction of the R403 and R408 regional roads, about 40 km (25 mi) from Dublin. Founded in the late 18th century, its 2022 population was 2,413, making it the 15th largest town in County Kildare.

== History ==
The English name of Prosperous was given when the village was founded in the late 18th century by Sir Robert Brooke. The village takes its Irish name from the townland lying to the east, Corrchoill or an Chorrchoill (meaning "the smooth forest"), anglicised variously as Corr[y]hill[s], Curr[i]hill[s] and Curryhills. An alternative meaning is "The wood of the small round hill" 4 and this makes sense topographically as there is a low hill immediately to the east of the village. The village extends into the surrounding townlands of Ballinafagh, Killybegs, Curryhills and Downings (north, south, east and west, respectively).

The town of Prosperous owes its origin to the vision and ideals of Sir Robert Brooke (1744-1811) from County Cavan. The late eighteenth century was a time of attempted industrial development in Ireland. Within 3 years, a town of roughly 200 houses was formed in an attempt to establish an industrial town. The products of the manufacturing would be linen, but more so cotton. The cotton manufacturing ceased no more than 10 years after it began, due to a lack of finances. The cotton manufacturing became a thing of the past in Prosperous, as a result of disturbances caused by a rebellion in 1798. The name chosen by Brooke for his industrial town could only be the product of a confident dream. Brooke modelled and based Prosperous on the 'Manchester manufactories' of Lancashire.

The town of Prosperous is located within 19 miles of Dublin and this was seen to be advantageous because it would reduce transport costs. As the Bog of Allen was located nearby this provided plenty of fuel to the area and is also suggestive of why the town of Prosperous was chosen for this industrial settlement. A close parallel to the development of Prosperous was Stratford-on-Slaney in County Wicklow, founded by Henry Stratford, Earl of Aldeborough in 1785 as a textile centre. Despite huge investment and, in the case of Prosperous, much building and an initial population of 4,000, both industrial ventures were failures. Stratford practically disappeared and Prosperous declined because in 1785 there was a water shortage due to the bog drying up, this affected the people within the town of Prosperous. This has been described by Lewis in 1837 as ‘little more than a pile of ruins' situated 'in a low marshy spot, surrounded by bogs and without water of importance nor reasonable hope of its revival' and more recently as a ‘straggling village labouring under its resounding name'. Prosperous has been described as a costly experiment as £132,000 was spent over the 5-year period.

Thomas James Rawson, in his Statistical Survey of the County of Kildare in 1807 described the failed endeavour thus:

An extensive cotton manufactory was some years since established at Prosperous, in Clane barony, by captain Brooke; he had no knowledge of the business; he committed it to the care of others; of course every thing went to ruin.

A number of ráths have survived in the Prosperous area, indicating settlement of the place in early Christian times. Time has not been kind to these ancient fortifications although in the case of one, it has been preserved as the centrepiece of a housing development: Rath View. There is a fort, or rath, just outside Prosperous on the eastern side of The Blackstick (R409 road to Caragh).

It is possible that the townland of Downings takes its name from the word dún, the Irish for 'fort', although questionable - given the higher proliferation of raths in many other parts of Ireland. Another explanation is that the local population used to converge at the nearby church on Sunday or in Irish Dé Domhnaigh (IPA: [dʲeː ˈd̪ˠoːn̪ˠiː, dʲeː ˈd̪ˠəun̪ˠiː]) – a closer phonetic match. Some confusion arose after the late 1990s when a housing development in the village was named The Downings.

Downings graveyard and church ruins, in the townland of Downings North - north of the R403 to Allenwood, mark the place of the first Christian church in the area. Tradition states that the church occupies the site of the cell of St Farnan whose feast is celebrated on 15 February. Nearby is the well of St Farnan which is said to have been blessed by the saint, giving it the valuable property that those who drink of its water never after have any relish for intoxicating drink. The old parish in this area was known as Downings. It was joined to the parish of Caragh in the eighteenth century.

There is another ruined church surrounded by a graveyard at Killybegs. The Knights Hospitaller of St. John of Jerusalem had a Commandery here but very little is known about it. A lease of 1538 refers to the priory and this points to its foundation before that date. The octagonal baptismal font with its carving of an angel, which is now at Prosperous church, came from Killybegs.

During penal times there was a Mass-house in the townland of Goatstown which is north of the Grand Canal. When the town of Prosperous was built, a Catholic church was erected near the crossroads close to the present Drama Hall. This church was replaced by the present limestone church, the Church of Our Lady and St Joseph in 1869.

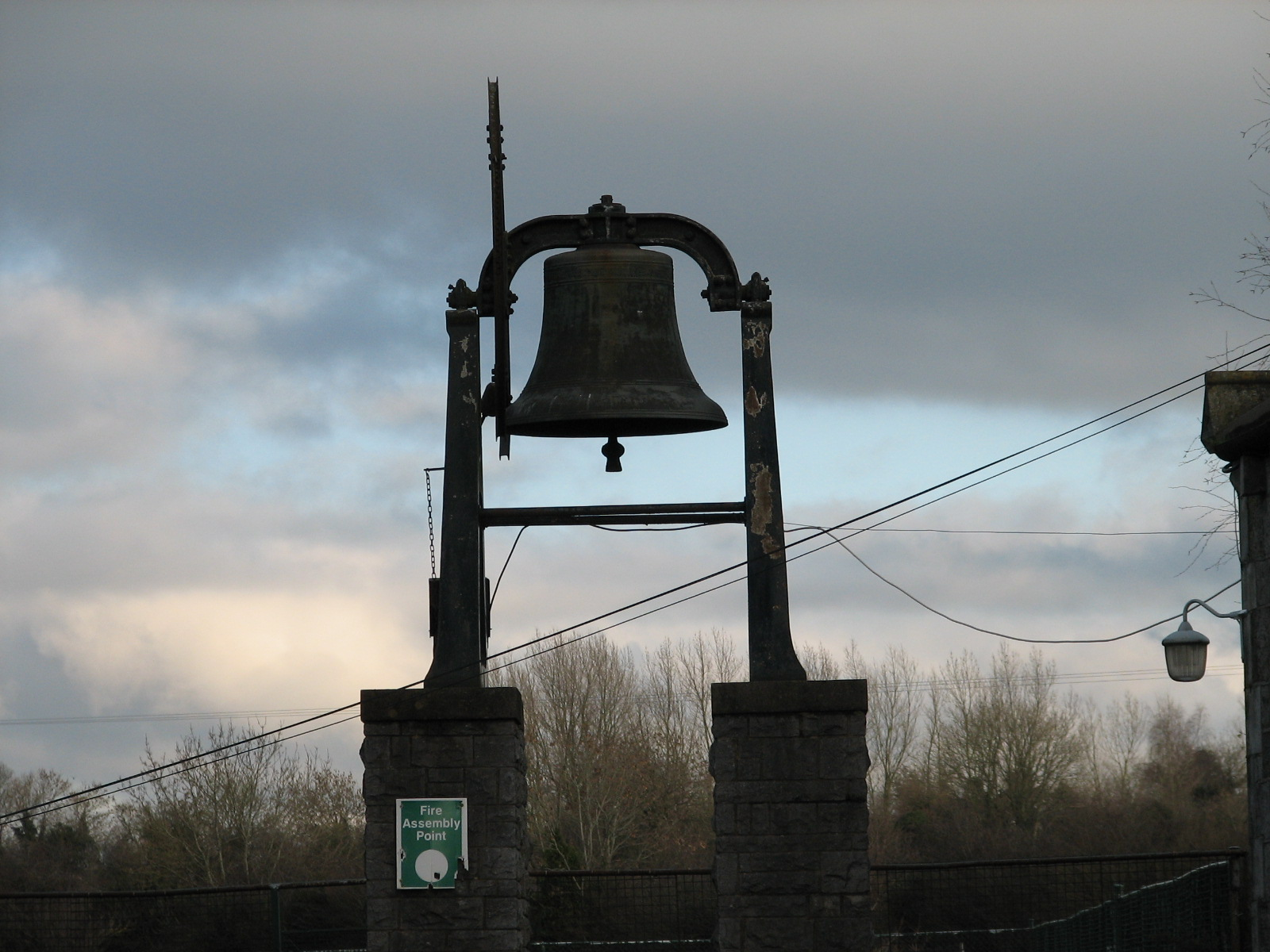
The Church Bell

Ballynafagh Church, a Church of Ireland building to the north of Prosperous, was in use 1831 to 1959.

Thomas Harris (1895 – 18 February 1974) was a prominent Fianna Fáil politician from the town. A native of Cloncurry, near the Meath border, he was raised in Prosperous by his aunt Elizabeth Tierney. As a young man Thomas Harris had joined the Gaelic League while in school in Prosperous and subsequently joined the Irish Republican Brotherhood, County Kildare. Harris fought with the Maynooth contingent in the 1916 Easter Rising in Dublin and was imprisoned in Frongoch, Wales until August 1916. Harris was later Captain of the Prosperous Company in 1917 and later Vice-Commandant North Kildare Battalion of the Irish Republican Army in 1921. A farmer, he represented the constituencies of Kildare from 1927 to 1937, Carlow–Kildare from 1937 to 1948, and Kildare again from 1948 to 1957. He lost his seat at the 1957 general election and retired from politics.

The town lent its name to Christy Moore's 1972 album, Prosperous, which was recorded there.

=== Battle of Prosperous ===
On 20 May 1798, Cork City Militia stormed the town of Prosperous, with Captain Richard Swayne demanding that all weapons be handed in to the militia. They threatened to burn down buildings if the inhabitants of Prosperous did not comply during a 'reign of terror' in the town. On the eve of 24 May, rebels attacked the barracks in which the militia were staying, killing most of them, including Swayne himself. Swayne was shot dead and his body burned in a barrel of tar.

== Modern town ==
Despite the disappearance of all of the industrial buildings several of the houses of 1780 have survived along the broad Main Street with its two squares. These add great charm to the historic core of the town centre. This, along with development along the main through-road, has effectively created a town in two sections. The main road through Prosperous is the R403 and the town is within 20 km (12 mi) of both the M4 (to the north) and M7 (to the south) motorways. Prosperous Main Street, however, runs perpendicular to the R403.

The village's educational, shopping, social and community facilities serve the people of the surrounding area. It is now developing as a residential centre serving the industrial development of northern Kildare and the growing city of Dublin. In 2011 it had 748 private households and its population was 2,248 consisting of 1,132 women and 1,116 men. At that time 888 people said they spoke Irish and 167 people said they spoke another language other than English or Irish.

== Leisure ==
Prosperous Dramatic Society Theatrical productions are held in the drama theatre, located in the parish centre.

Pitch and Putt A pitch and putt course, and its clubhouse, are situated in the community field beside the church.

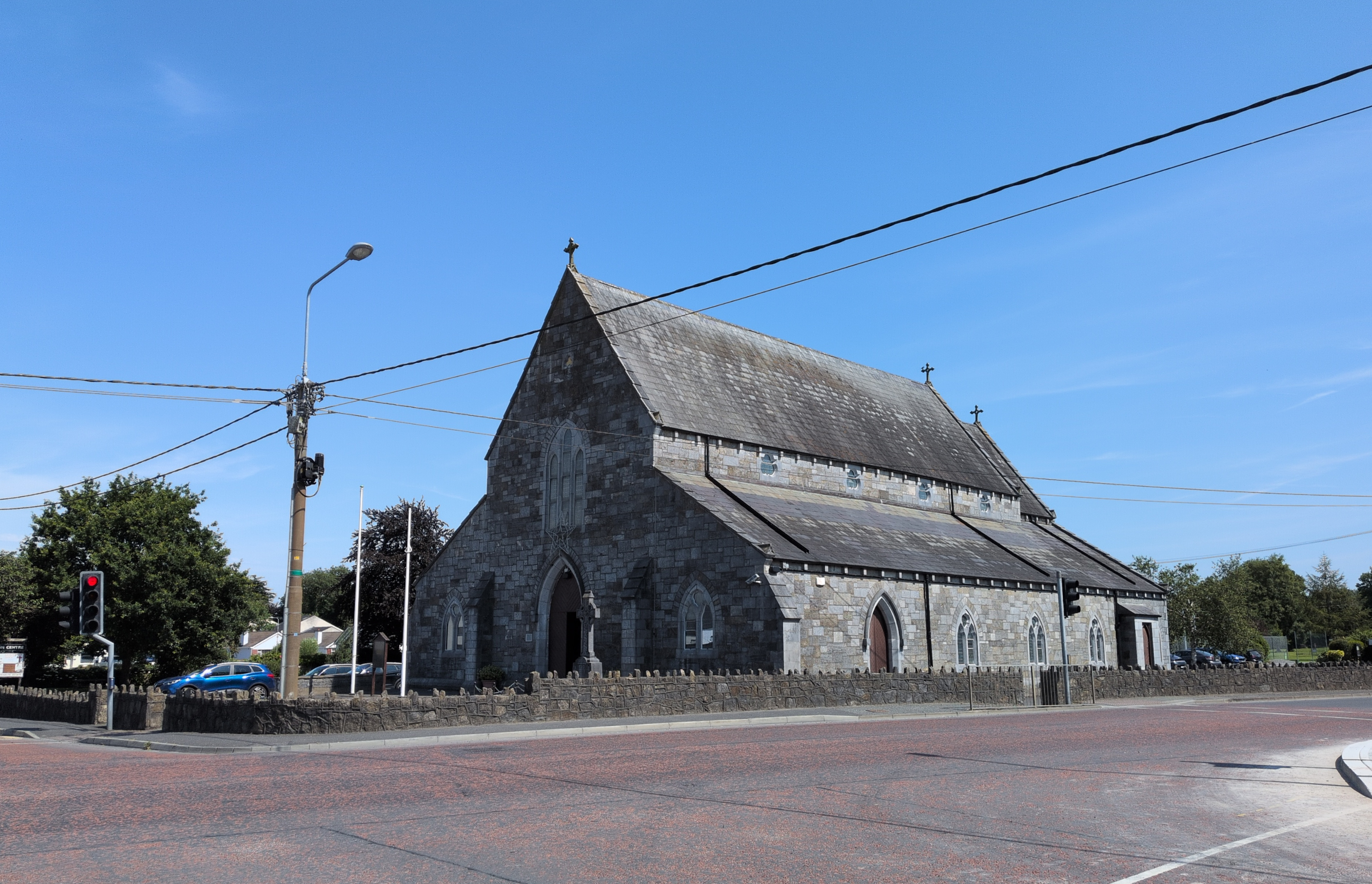
Church of Our Lady and St. Joseph at the central crossroads

Tennis Courts Tennis courts are situated beside the church across from the local primary school.

Golf Society Christy's Golf Society is based in Christy's public house. It was founded in 1995.

Soccer The local soccer club is Prosperous United A.F.C.

G.A.A. The local Gaelic football team is Caragh G.F.C. and the local hurling team is Éire Óg/Chorr Choill.

In summer months, a group of students from the Basque area of Spain come to Prosperous and stay at local homes.

Prosperous Music Festival Prosperous Music Festival ran from 2012 to 2018. Over 50 bands and acts attended the event over a weekend and it was a free-to-attend event. Different types of music could be heard at the festival, and it attracted an average of 3,000 people annually.

== Public transport ==
Prosperous is well served by Bus Éireann route 120 Edenderry as well as routes 121 Tullamore and 123 Robertstown. Buses to Dublin depart as frequently as every 15–30 minutes during peak commuter times.

== Education ==
Primary education is provided by Prosperous National School/Scoil an Linbh Íosa. It has an enrolment of 500 pupils. Secondary education for Prosperous and surrounding areas is provided by Saint Farnan's Post-Primary School, which opened in 1941.

== See also ==
- List of towns and villages in Ireland
