= Ticknevin =

Townland in County Kildare, Ireland

Coordinates: 53.318°N 6.955°W

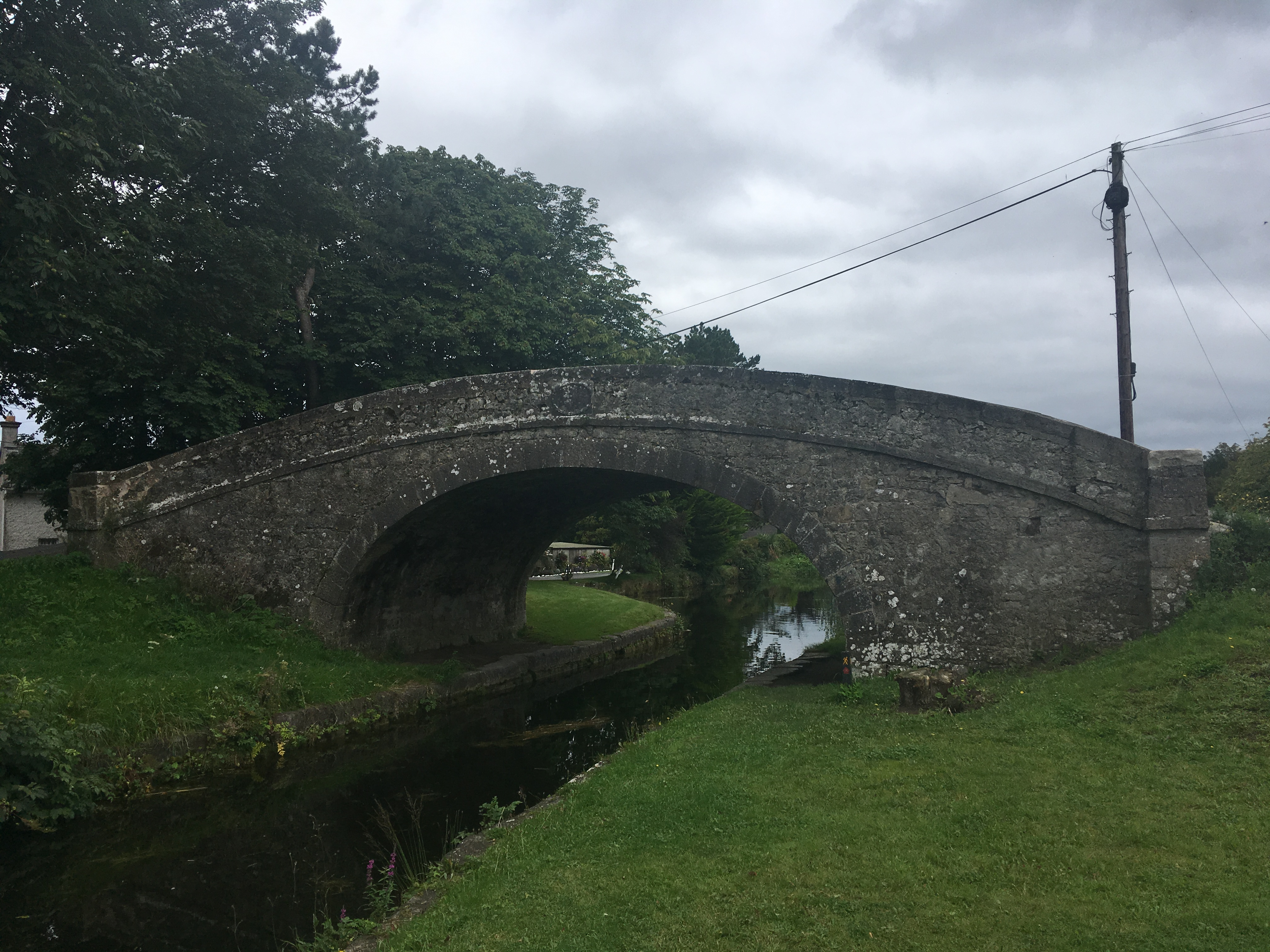
Ticknevin Bridge

Ticknevin (Irish: Tigh Mhic Neamhain) is a townland in the parish of Carbury in County Kildare, Ireland.

The Grand Canal runs through Ticknevin and the 20th canal lock is located there. There is also a humpback bridge which was built by the English engineer Thomas Hartley in the 18th century.

Home to the Naas Ball.
