= R407 road (Ireland) =

Road in Ireland

Coordinates: 53.231069°N 6.660681°W

R407 road
- Bóthar R407
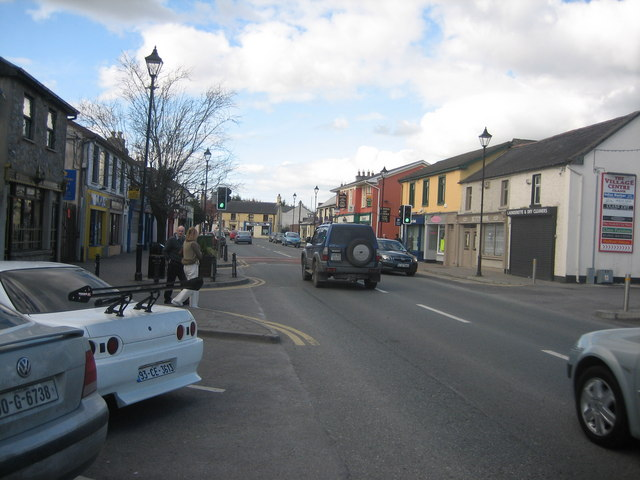
- Clane Main Street, part of the R407

Route information
- Length: 22.3 km (13.9 mi)

Major junctions
- From: M4 Junction 8
- Crosses Baltracey River; R408 Boherhole; R403 Clane; Passes through Sallins and crosses Grand Canal
- To: R445 Naas

Location
- Country: Ireland

Highway system
- Roads in Ireland; Motorways; Primary; Secondary; Regional

The R407 road is a regional road in Ireland, located in County Kildare.
