= R409 road (Ireland) =

Road in Ireland

R409 road
- Bóthar R409
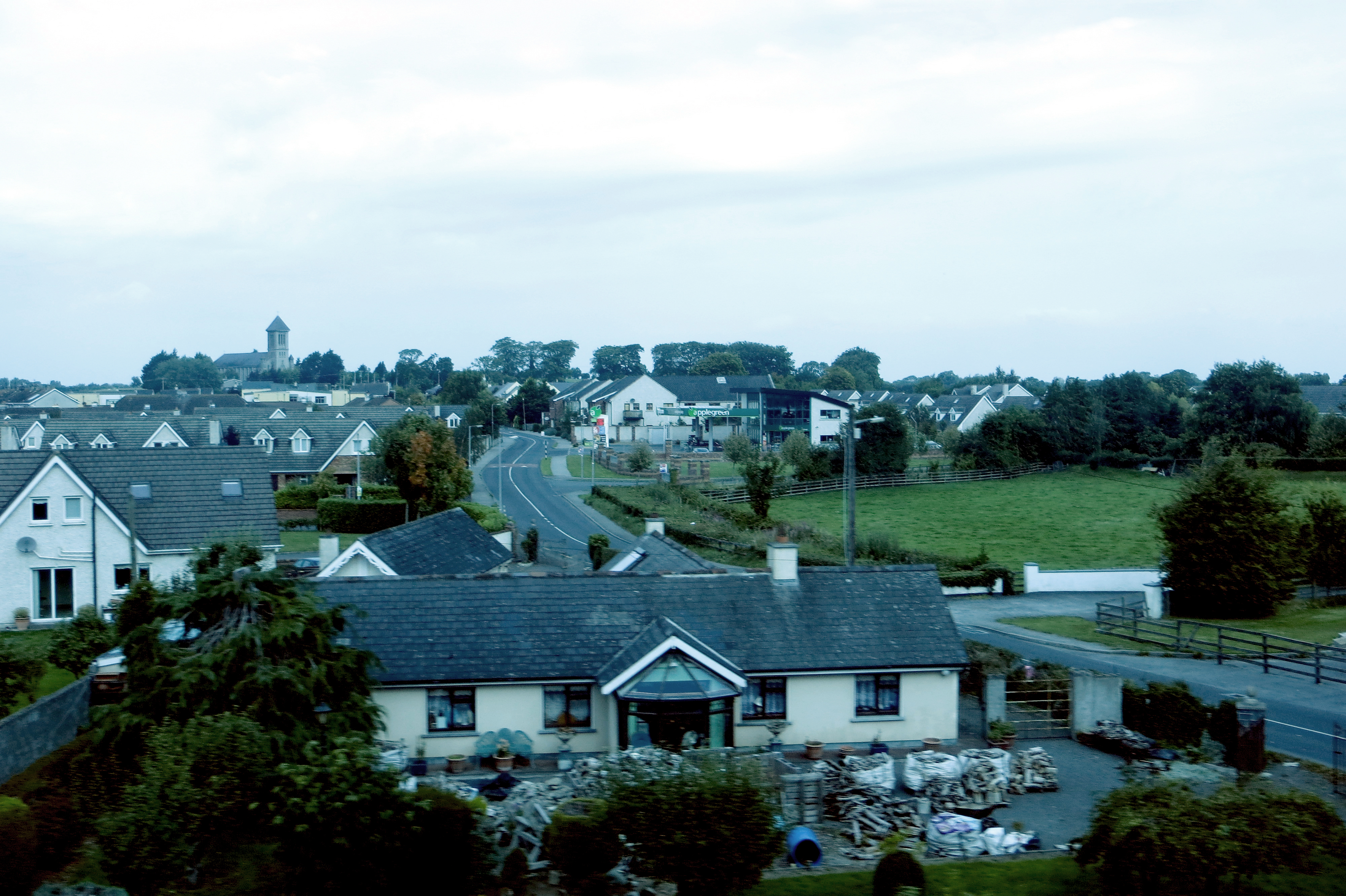
- Caragh, County Kildare, on the R409

Route information
- Length: 13 km (8.1 mi)

Location
- Country: Ireland
- Primary destinations: County Kildare; Naas – leaves the R445; Crosses over the M7 motorway; Crosses over the River Liffey; Crosses under the Dublin-Cork railway line; Caragh; Passes Mondello Park; Crosses over the Grand Canal; Terminates at the R403

Highway system
- Roads in Ireland; Motorways; Primary; Secondary; Regional

The R409 road is a regional road in Ireland that passes through the village of Caragh in County Kildare. It starts at Naas and travels north-west through Caragh village, passes Mondello Park race-track and ends at the intersection with the R403 road. The route is 13 km (8.1 mi) long.

== See also ==
- Roads in Ireland
- National primary road
- National secondary road
