= Carbury, County Kildare =

Village in County Kildare, Ireland

Carbury Cairbre
- Village
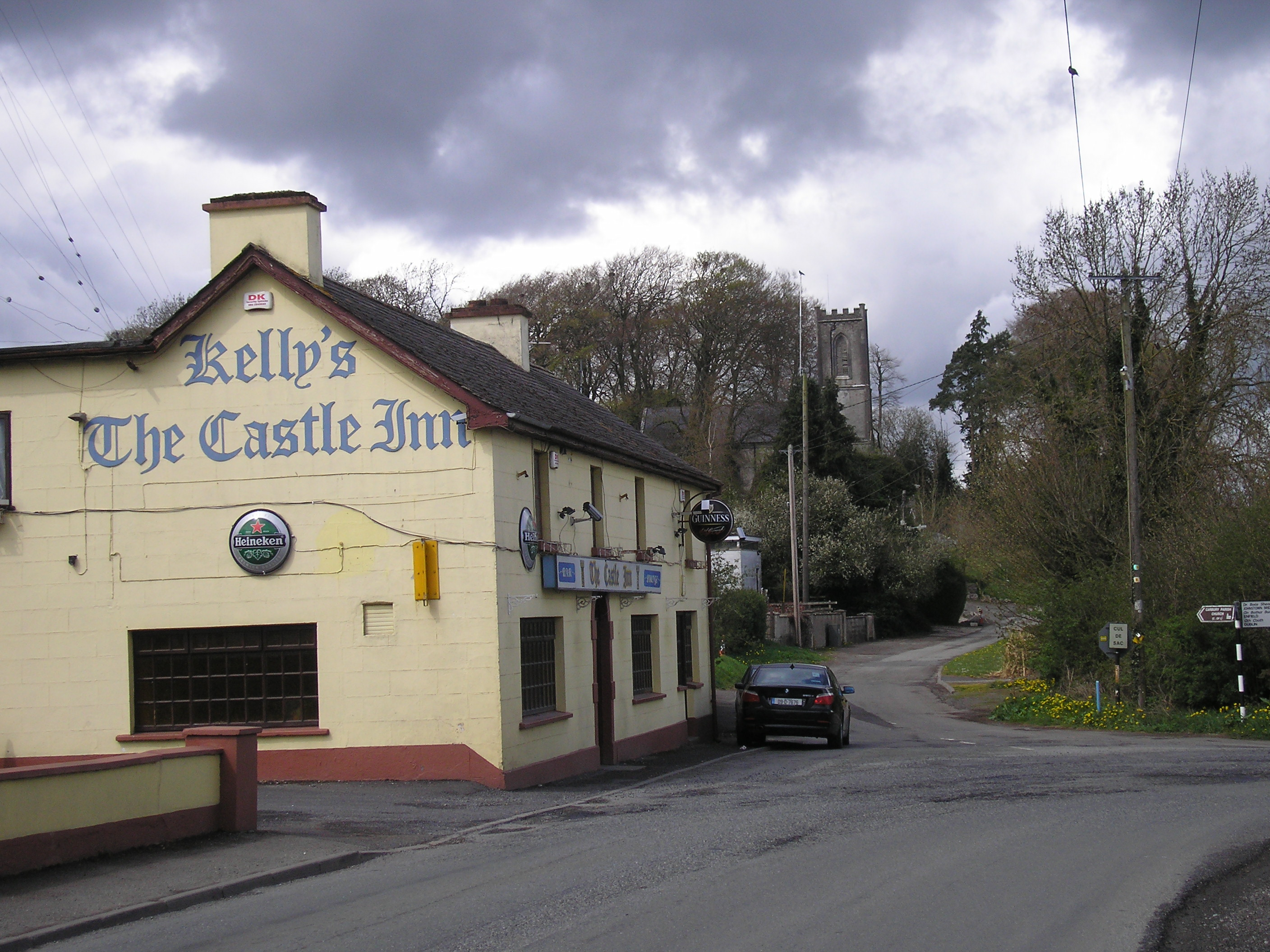

- Location in Ireland
- Coordinates: 53°22′01″N 6°58′01″W
- Country: Ireland
- Province: Leinster
- County: County Kildare
- Time zone: UTC+0 (WET)
  - Summer (DST): UTC-1 (IST (WEST))
- Irish Grid Reference: N700339

Carbury (Irish: Cairbre), also formerly spelt "Carbery", is a rural community and a village in north-west County Kildare, Ireland. It is situated on the R402 regional road between Enfield and Edenderry, near the border with County Offaly, and includes the smaller hamlets of Derrinturn, Ticknevin and Killina along the Grand Canal (Ireland). The source of the River Boyne is located just north of the village. The village is in a townland and civil parish of the same name.

== Places of interest ==
=== Carbury Hill ===
This prominent hill just north of the village of Carbury has been inhabited since the Bronze Age. Although partly silted up, at least two barrows from that time can still be found on top of the hill.

The site was anciently known as Sídhe Neachtain or “The Mansion of Neachtain”, from Nuadha Neacht, a leader of the mythological Tuatha de Danann who became King of Leinster for a year In 45 AD according to the Annals of the Four Masters. He and his brothers were the keepers of the well at the foot of the hill, (now Trinity Well at Newberry Hall, Carbury, County Kildare) which was associated with the gift of wisdom. When Neachtain married the goddess Boann (or Bóinn), she wanted to see the sacred well, but was never allowed to visit it, since Neachtain had to keep the location a secret. One day Bóinn followed him and when she found the well, she allowed herself a taste from the forbidden waters. The well burst up, surging round the hill and through the country, all the way out to the Irish Sea. According to legend, the curious Bóinn was swept along with the rushing waters and drowned, and thus the River Boyne - an embodiment of her spirit - was created.

The last reference to Sidh Neachtain in the Annals of the Four Masters records the death of Laoghaire, High King of Ireland and son of Niall of the Nine Hostages, at Sidh Neachtain in 458AD. His brother Cairbre (from whom Carbury gets its name) established a dynasty which controlled the hill in subsequent centuries as the centre of the territory known as Cairbre Uí Chiardha (which may still be seen on signposts in the area). They were the Ó Ciardha sept of the Southern Uí Néill (anglicised Carey, Carry and Keary) who were the Lords of Carbury mentioned in the Annals of the Four Masters in 952.

The ancient settlement was close to the old strategic road called Eiscar Riada or Slí Mhor (the "High Road"), which connected the east of Ireland with the River Shannon and the west.

=== Carbury Castle ===
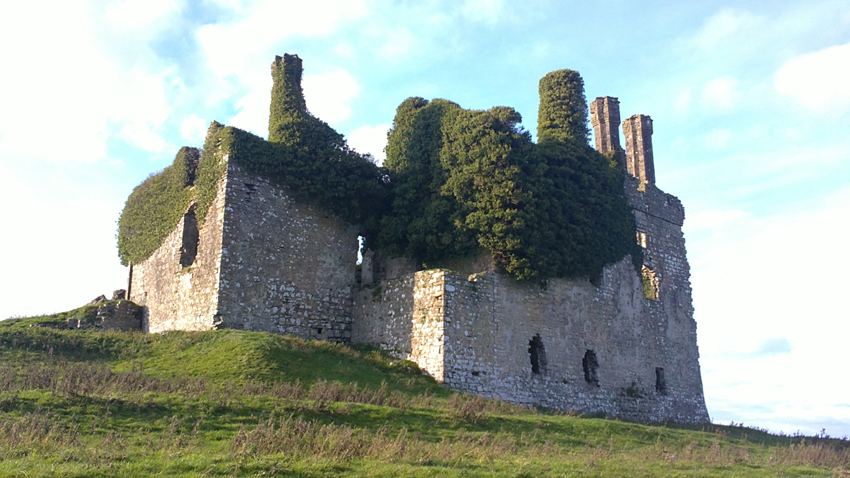
Carbury Castle Ruins, County Kildare, Ireland

After the 12th century Norman invasion, Meiler Fitzhenry was granted the Carbury area. The motte on the top of the hill behind the current castle was probably built by Meiler FitzHenry who was granted the area by Strongbow. The complex was acquired by the de Berminghams in the 14th century, from whom it passed by inheritance to the Preston family, who held the title Baron Gormanston, before being retaken by the Irish in the 15th century. The 1st Earl of Shrewsbury, John Talbot, later also Earl of Wexford, Earl of Waterford and Baron of Dungarvan, rebuilt Carbury Castle after 1428–1447.

From 23 October 1554 a 21-year lease was granted to Sir Henry Colley (the patrilineal ancestor of the Dukes of Wellington); this was renewed, and the Colley family built a large stronghouse on the hilltop in the 17th century. The central scenic focus of Carbury Hill now is the ruins of that Tudor mansion of the Colleys, which was also known as Fairy Hill.

The hill was also a camping site used by the Irish during the United Irishmen Rebellion of 1798.

== Sport ==
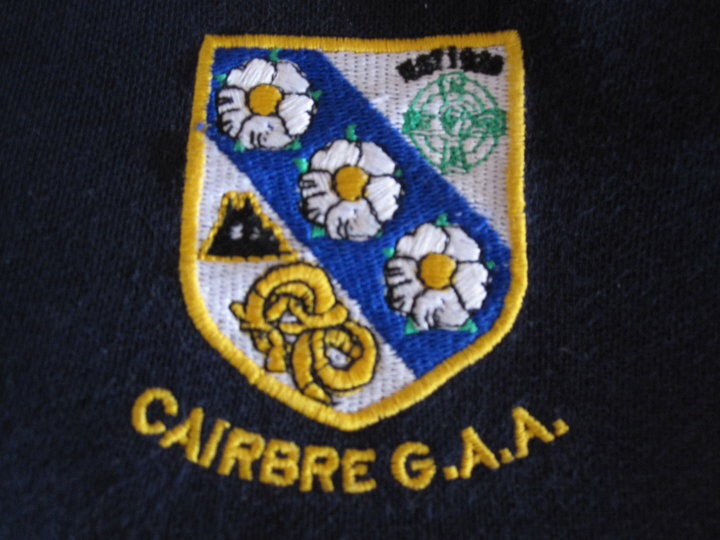
Carbury GAA Stitched Patch

Carbury GAA is the local Gaelic football club, winner of 11 Kildare county senior football championships. Carbury GAA Club was founded in 1925. Since then it has grown and developed to become one of the leading senior clubs in County Kildare. The club has around 150 adult members and 150 Juvenile members. The club fields fourteen football teams for both men and women.

Carbury S.C is the local soccer club which was formed when Carbury Utd and Parsonstown Utd merged.

== Namesake ==
The small village of Carbury located in Bottineau County in the U.S. State of North Dakota is named after Carbury.

== Transport ==
Carbury railway station was opened by the Midland Great Western Railway on 10 April 1877 as part of its branch line from Enfield to Edenderry. The station closed to regular passenger traffic on 1 June 1931, and to goods traffic on 1 September 1932. The branch remained in use for occasional special trains until final closure on 1 April 1963. The station building survives as a private residence.

== People ==
- Tony Adams, film producer
- Clement Johnson, cricketer who played test cricket for South Africa
- Dudley Colley, MP and 17th century owner of Castle Carbury
- Thomas Flanagan, auxiliary bishop of the Diocese of San Antonio in the US
