= Caragh =

Village in County Kildare, Ireland

Caragh Ceárach
- Village
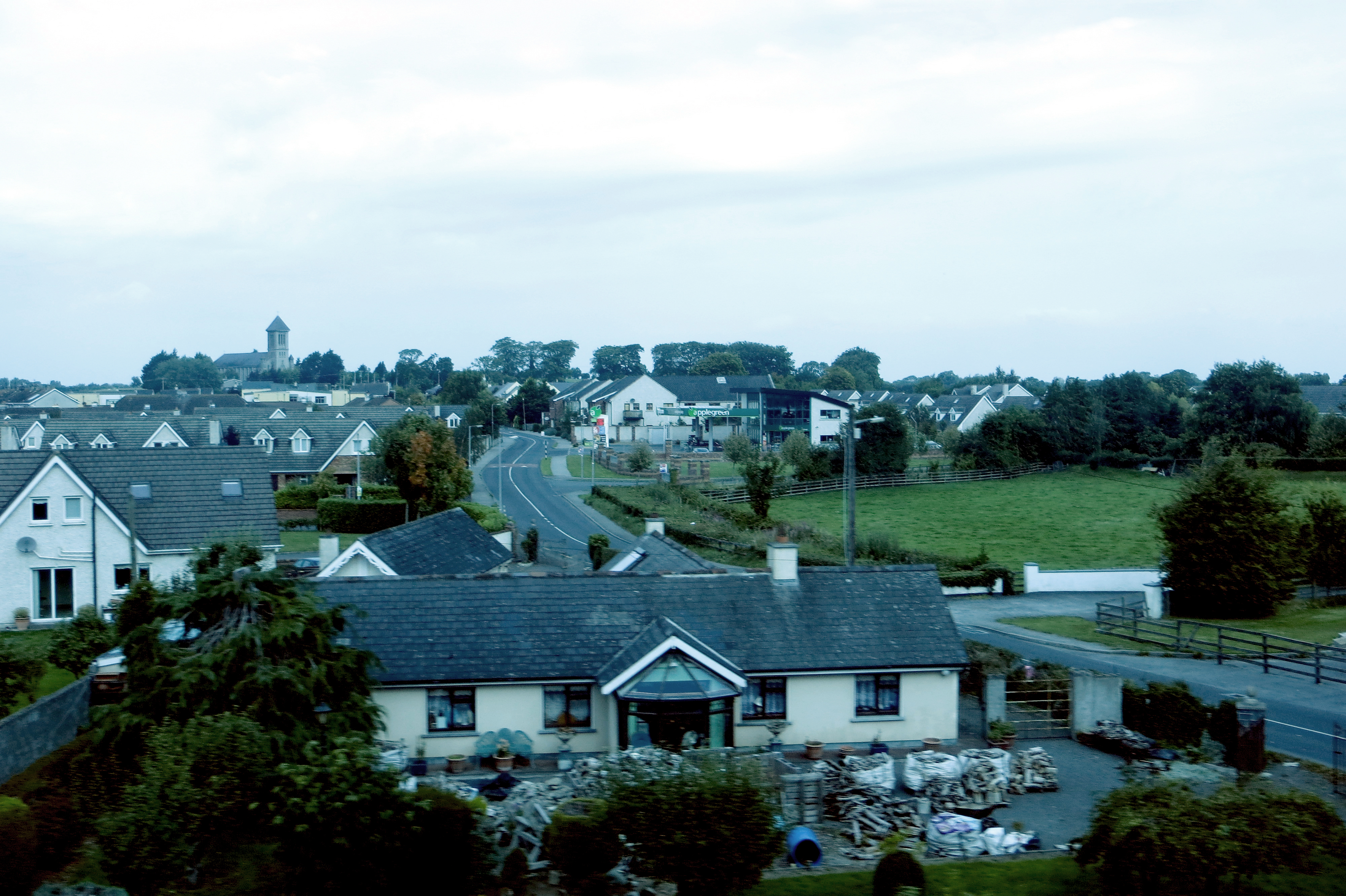
- Carragh village looking north

- Location in Ireland
- Coordinates: 53°14′14″N 6°43′44″W
- Country: Ireland
- Province: Leinster
- County: County Kildare
- Elevation: 117.5 m (385 ft)

Population (2016)
  - Total: 966
- Time zone: UTC+0 (WET)
  - Summer (DST): UTC-1 (IST (WEST))
- Irish Grid Reference: N844218
- Website: www.caragh.net

Caragh or Carragh (Irish: Ceárach) is a village in County Kildare, Ireland. It is located on the R409 regional road between the River Liffey and the Grand Canal and is located 6.1 km north-west of Naas. The village is also 7.9 km from Clane and 10.6 km from Newbridge.

Caragh is also the name of the parish that includes the village itself, surrounding townlands, and the village of Prosperous, about 3 km northwest of Caragh.

== Name ==
Kildare County Council, OSI and other government bodies and agencies use the spelling "Carragh". This spelling is used only on official maps, planning notices and other official documents.

== Geography ==
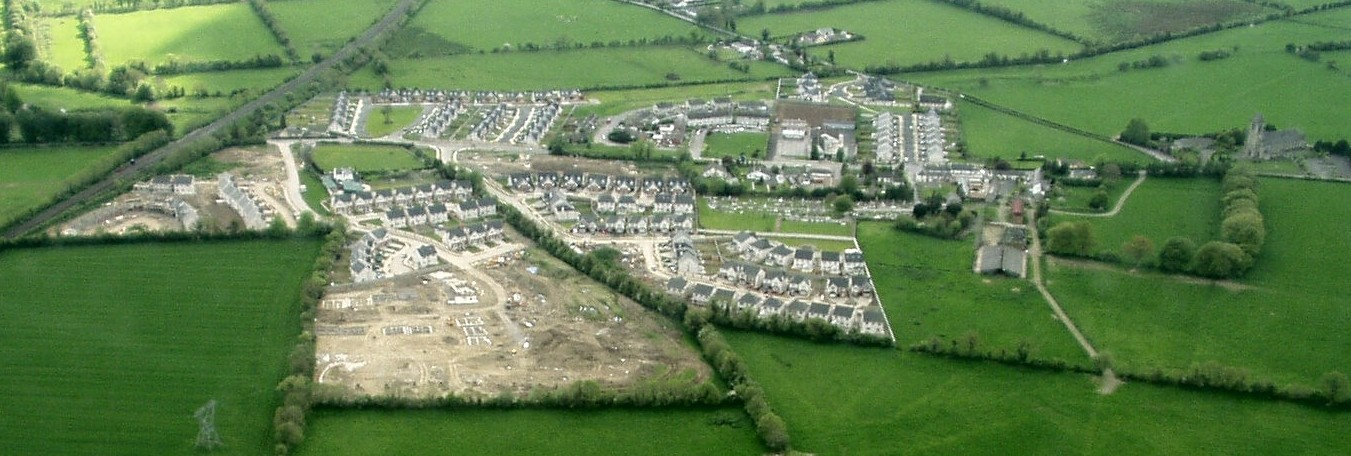
Aerial shot of Caragh village (c. 2004)

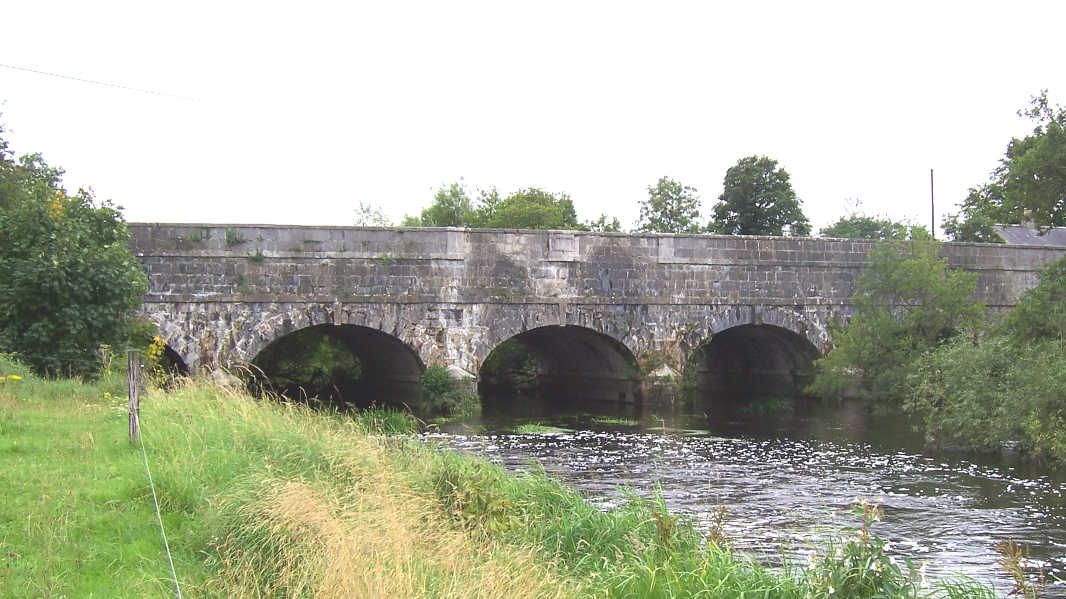
The Leinster Aqueduct

The village is situated in the northern half of County Kildare approximately 3 km north-west of junction 10 of the M7 motorway. The Liffey flows adjacent to the village. There is a single traffic lane bridge crossing the Liffey approaching Caragh on the R409 from the south. A local historian claims that it is the oldest bridge still in existence on the entire course of the river.

The Bog of Allen, a peatland region that covers large parts of central Ireland, borders the village.

== Amenities ==
The main features in the village are a large Roman Catholic church (Our Lady & St. Joseph), a well stocked shop, a pub, a national primary school and Mondello motor racing circuit (approx. 1.5 km from village centre). As of March 2010, the church and school in the village are undergoing extensive redevelopment.

== Transport ==
The Dublin to Cork railway line runs through the village, but there is no railway station. The Grand Canal also runs past Caragh, and nearby is the Leinster Aqueduct where the Grand Canal crosses over the river Liffey.

== Representation ==
The village forms part of the Kildare South Dáil constituency for national elections. For County Council elections, Caragh is within the Naas Local Electoral Area of Kildare County Council.

== Demographics ==
Historical population
Year	Pop.	±%
2002	242	—
2006	751	+210.3%
2011	882	+17.4%
2016	966	+9.5%

The population of Caragh has grown significantly in the early 21st century, increasing from 242 inhabitants in 2002, to 751 as of the 2006 census, to 966 by the time of the 2016 census. The 2016 census recorded a 'housing stock' of 263 homes within the village boundary.

== Sport ==
There are a number of Gaelic Athletic Association clubs in and around Caragh (Éire Óg-Corrachoill CLG, Raheens GAA and Caragh GFC), and a ladies' Gaelic football team (Robert Emmets). Raheens GAA is a Gaelic football club which has its grounds at Tom Lawlor Park, approximately 0.5 km from the village. The local community hall of Caragh is situated adjacent to the pitch and is used for indoor training during winter. Caragh GFC, also a football club, is based in Prosperous. The local hurling club, Éire Óg-Corrachoill CLG, is an amalgamation of two former clubs associated with the villages of Prosperous and Caragh. The local ladies football team, Robert Emmets, is made up of people from Raheens and Sallins, and trains in both Caragh and Sallins.

Caragh Celtic F.C. is a local association football (soccer) team that plays home games at a pitch in Donore in Caragh. There is also a fishing club in Caragh that meets at the Liffey Bridge and on the Osberstown Road towards Sallins. There is also some recreational fishing on the Grand Canal.

== Notable people ==
- Cathal McCarthy (b. 2006), professional footballer for UCD and Hull City
- Paddy Power (1928–2013), former politician, TD and government minister
- Sean Power (b. 1960), former politician and TD for the Kildare South Dáil constituency

== See also ==
- List of towns and villages in Ireland
