= Ballynafagh Church =

- Teampall Bhaile na Faiche
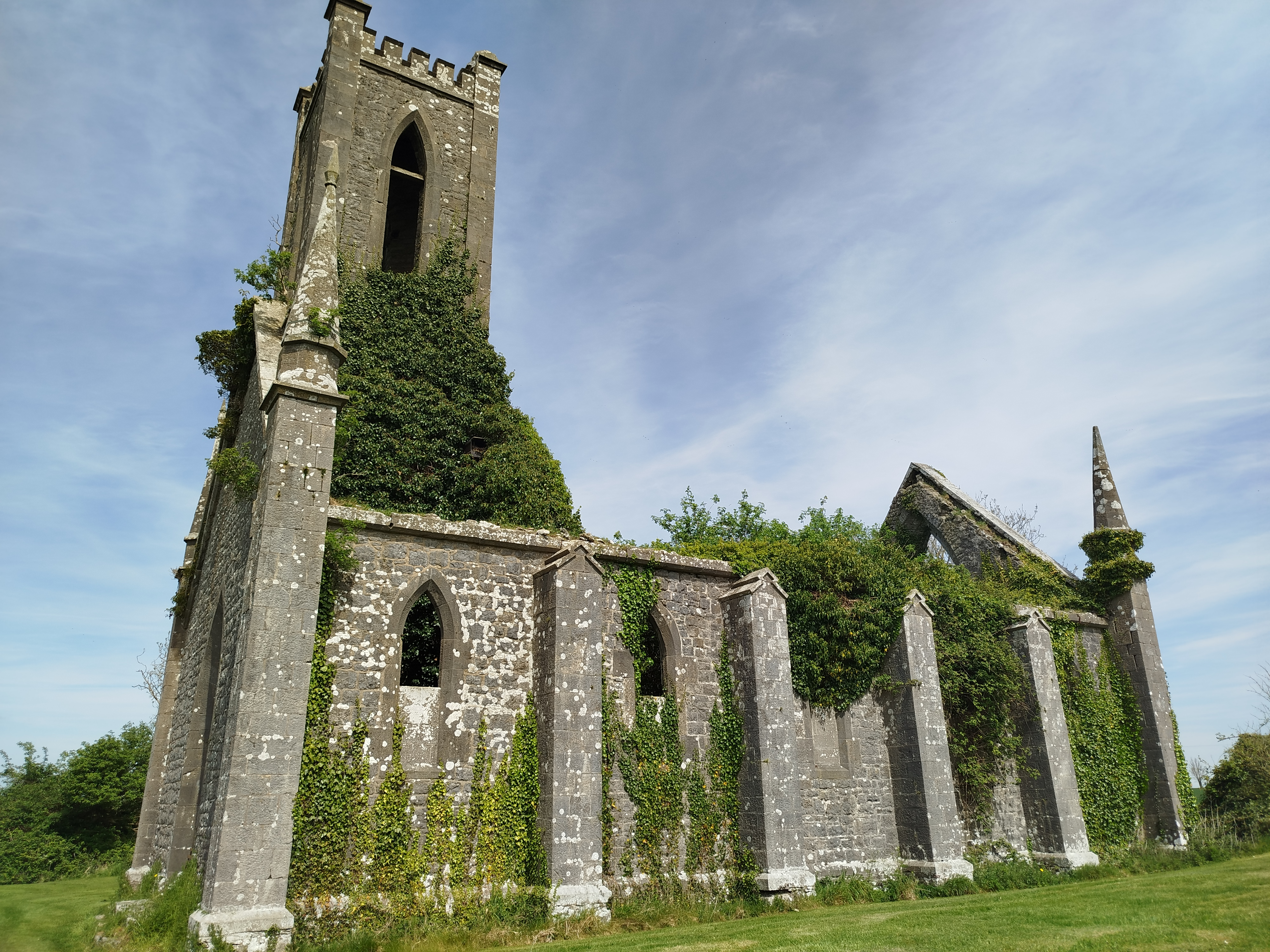
- South wall and tower

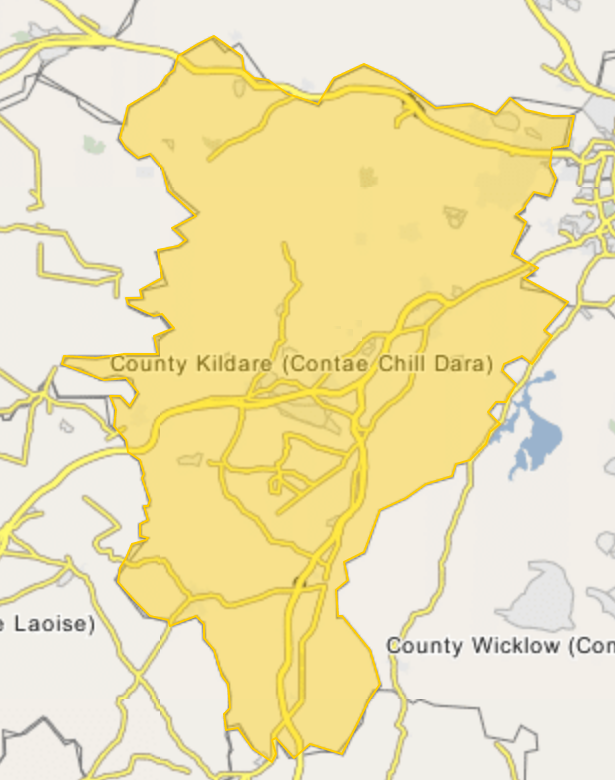
- Location within County Kildare
- 53°18′44″N 6°46′26″W
- Location: Ballynafagh, County Kildare, Ireland
- Country: Ireland
- Denomination: Church of Ireland

History
- Status: Closed
- Founded: 1831

Architecture
- Style: Gothic Revival
- Construction cost: £900

Specifications
- Capacity: 200
- Length: 16.5 metres (54 ft)
- Width: 7.5 metres (25 ft)
- Materials: Stone

Administration
- Diocese: Meath and Kildare

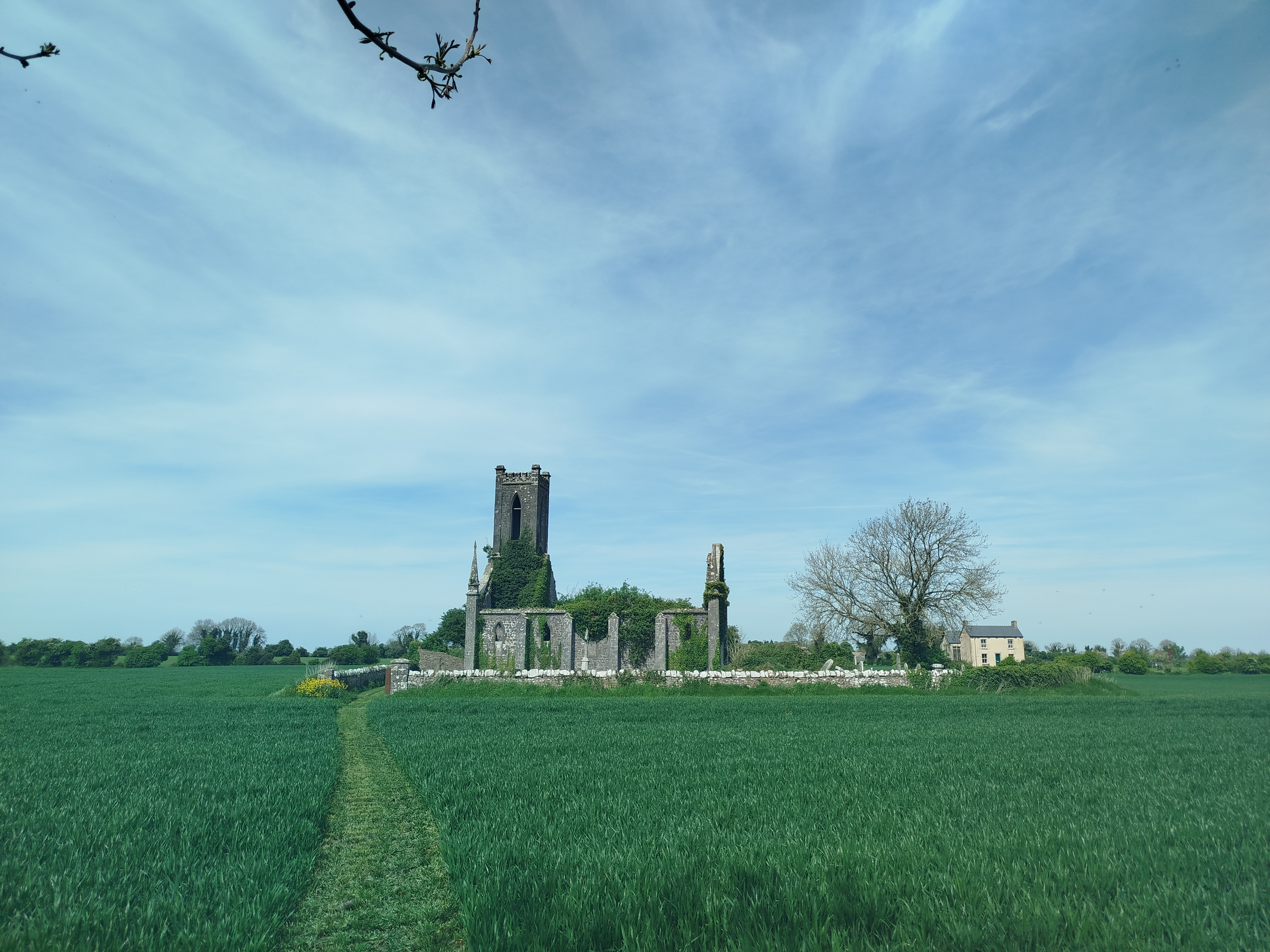
The church at Ballynafagh

Ballynafagh Church is a 19th-century church located in County Kildare, Ireland. There is also an older medieval church on the same site.

== Location ==
Ballynafagh Church is located in northern County Kildare, about 3 km (1.9 mi) north of Prosperous, east of Ballynafagh Lake and Ballynafagh Bog. The church lies in a rectangular enclosure in the middle of a wheat field.

== Buildings ==
=== Medieval church ===
Only the north wall and foundations of the east gable survive. The ruin is in the southeast corner of the site.

=== 1831 church ===
A Church of Ireland structure built in 1831 in a Gothic Revival style with £900 from the Board of First Fruits. It has a tall tower and each corner has sharp finials rising from four of the twelve buttresses. It ceased to be used in 1959 and was unroofed in 1985. Entrances and windows have been bricked up.
