= R406 road (Ireland) =

Road in Ireland

R406 road
- Bóthar R406
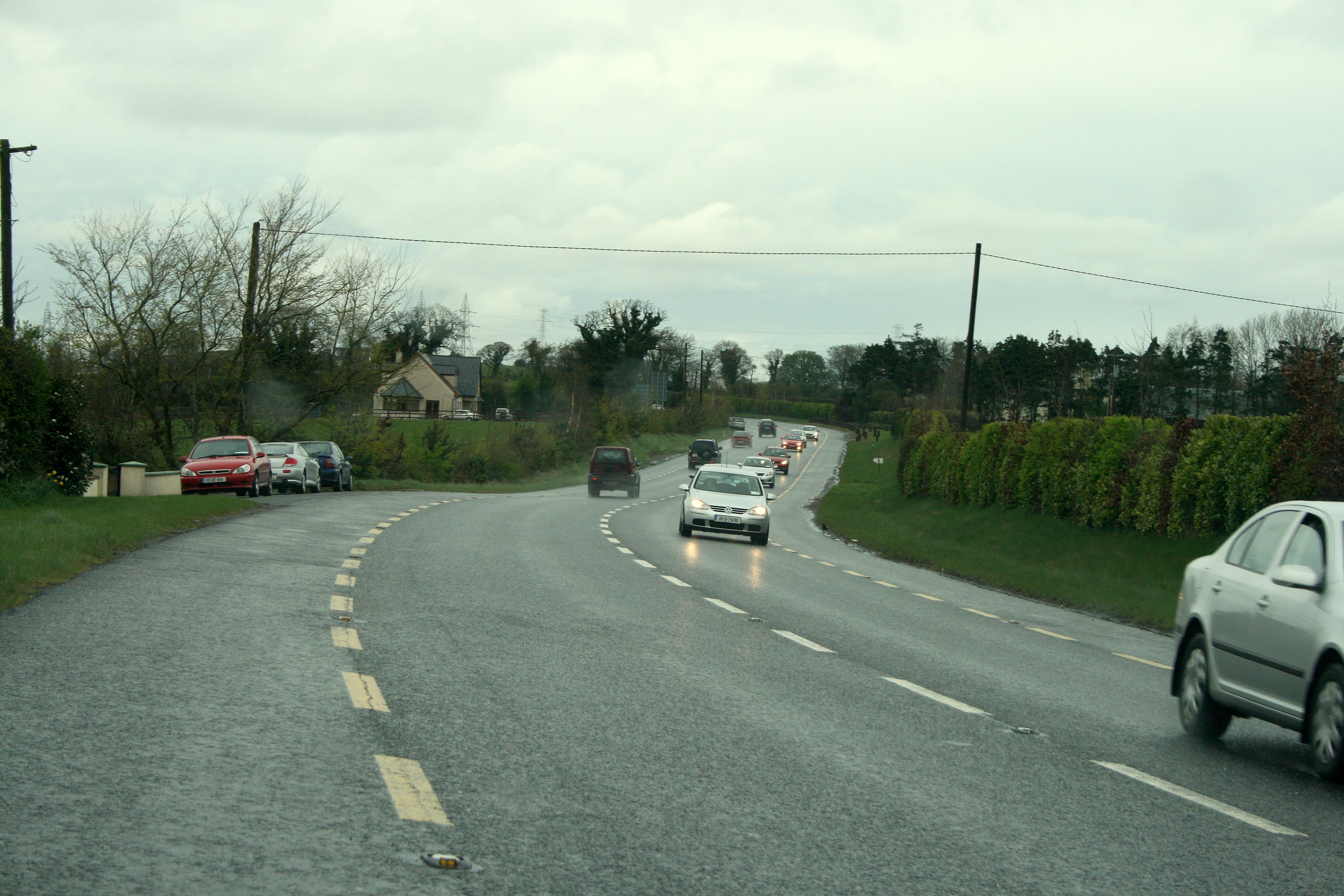
- R406 in north County Kildare

Route information
- Length: 6.0 km (3.7 mi)

Location
- Country: Ireland
- Primary destinations: County Kildare; Straffan – leaves R403 north of the village; Crosses the M4 motorway at junction 7.; Maynooth; Crosses the Royal Canal at Mullen Bridge.; Terminates at the R405 in Maynooth

Highway system
- Roads in Ireland; Motorways; Primary; Secondary; Regional

The R406 road is a regional road in Ireland, linking the Straffan to Maynooth in County Kildare.

It leaves the R403 near Straffan and heads north crossing the M4 motorway south of Maynooth. The road connects the K Club golf course which staged the 2006 Ryder Cup to the west and north of Dublin.

The road is 6 km (3.7 mi) long.

== See also ==
- Roads in Ireland
- National primary road
- National secondary road
