= Robert Brooke (East India Company officer) =

Robert Brooke probably c.1788, by John Smart.

Robert Brooke (1744–1811) was a lieutenant-colonel in the army of Bengal and governor of the island of St Helena from 1788 to 1800. He married, in 1775, Anna Maria Mapletoft, daughter of Reverend Robert Mapletoft, assistant chaplain to the East India Company at St John's, Calcutta; they had five sons and two daughters.

== Early history ==
Brooke was born in Rathavan House, Co. Cavan, Ireland, and entered the service of the East India Company in 1764 as a cadet, aged 20. After a career in military administration in India, he took sick leave and moved to Co. Kildare in Ireland. In 1775 he married Anna Maria Mapletoft Wynne and built Killybegs House (demolished in 1958).

He attempted to establish a cotton industry in the area, and the town of Prosperous owes its origin to the vision and ideals of Robert Brooke. The late eighteenth century was a time of attempted industrial development in Ireland, and the industry upon which Prosperous was founded in 1780 was cotton manufacturing. The name chosen by Brooke for his industrial town could only be the product of a confident dream. Within six years it had failed miserably. He spent his own money, that of his wife and the grants he received from Grattan's parliament. His losses were almost the equivalent of the national debt. He employed almost 4,000 by 1784, yet by 1786 the works and all his remaining property had to be abandoned to his creditors. Prosperous declined to such an extent as to be described by Lewis in 1837 as "little more than a pile of ruins" situated "in a low marshy spot, surrounded by bogs and without water of importance nor reasonable hope of its revival".

Despite having overstayed his leave in 1775, he applied for re-instatement in the army, and, although the request was initially refused, in fact he was almost immediately made governor on Saint Helena. He was appointed to the post of Governor of Saint Helena in 1788 to replace Daniel Corneille.

== St Helena ==
Brooke was appointed following a garrison mutiny under a civilian governor, and it is likely that his military background was seen as helpful to the maintenance of order. However, Brooke is best known for the extensive development and building works that were initiated during his administration. These included:

- Introduction of a signalling system to announce the arrival of ships
- Building of defensive positions against attack
- Building pipe networks to transport fresh water
- Extension of farming across the island
- Creation of a safe landing jetty

In addition, Brooke was responsible for the introduction of rules to restrict ill-treatment and encourage the well-being of slaves. He also used the location of St Helena, midway between Britain and Cape Colony to support the vulnerable position of British-held Cape Town at the end of the eighteenth century with soldiers and supplies, for which he was awarded a diamond-hilted presentation sword by the East India Company. He raised an island militia, and even tried to grow breadfruit and sago on the island, receiving seedlings from Captain William Bligh in 1792.

== Retirement ==
Brooke retired in 1800, leaving the island on 16 March 1800. An interim governor, Lieutenant-Governor Francis Robson, was appointed until 11 March 1802 when Brooke was succeeded as governor by his sister-in-law's husband: Colonel Robert Patton of the East India Company. Brooke died in 1811 at his home in Bath, Somerset. There is a memorial plaque in the church of St. Swithin, Walcot, Bath, attesting to his many qualities. His home at No. 8 Somerset Place in Bath became a part of the University of Bath Spa which has recently been sold for development. This Grade I listed property is again in private hands. He is still celebrated in Prosperous, County Kildare where there are two wall plaques – one marking the bi-centenary of the town he founded and the other depicting two females at weaving looms. There are also two street names linked to the family.
