= R403 road (Ireland) =

Road in Ireland

R403 road
- Bóthar R403
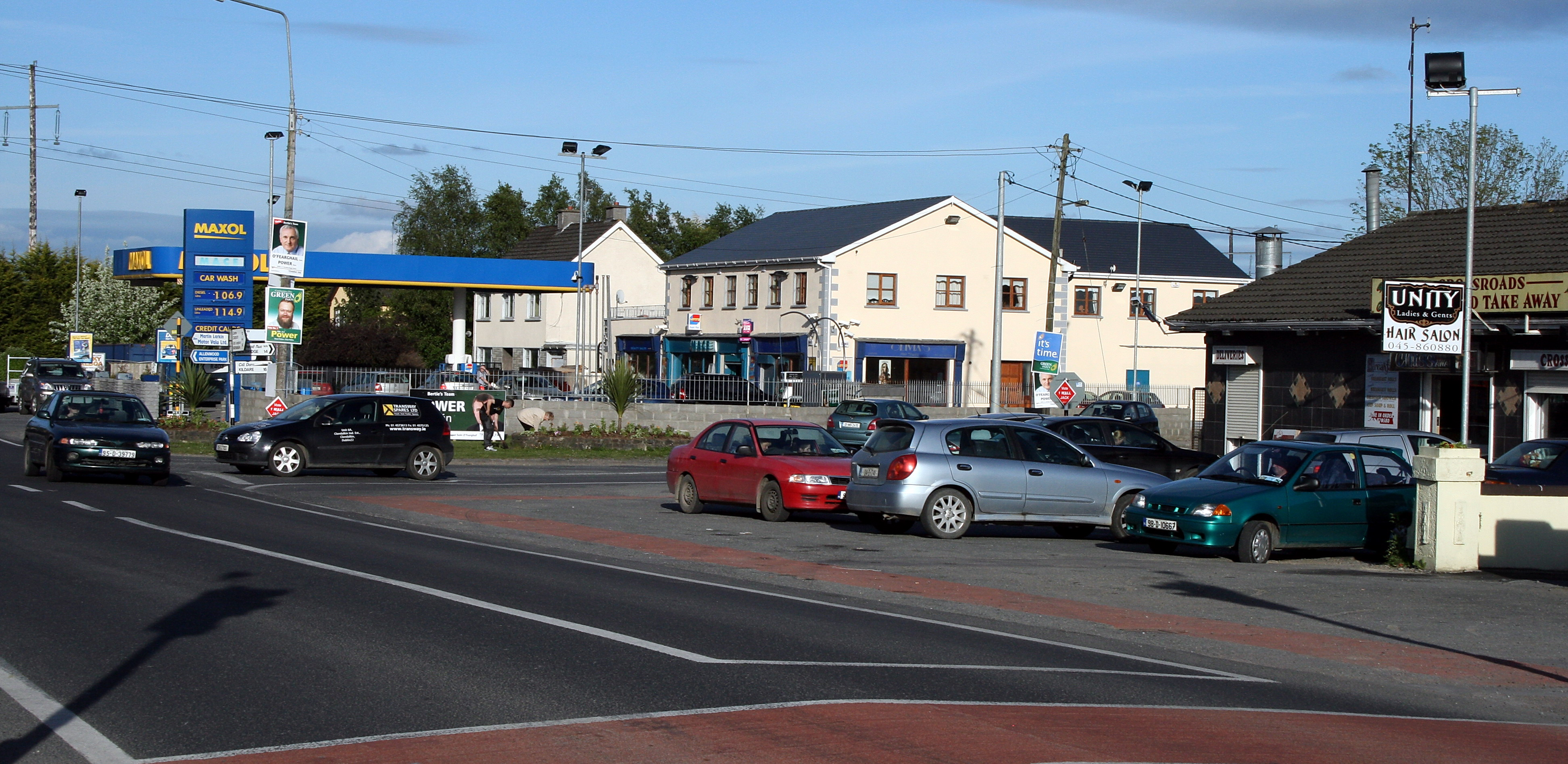
- R403 through Allenwood

Route information
- Length: 43 km (27 mi)

Location
- Country: Ireland
- Primary destinations: County Dublin; Lucan – leaves N4; Passes Weston Airport; County Kildare; Celbridge – joins R405 to cross the River Liffey; leaves R405; (R406); Clane (R407); Prosperous; (R415); Allenwood (R414); Derrinturn; Carbury terminates at the R402

Highway system
- Roads in Ireland; Motorways; Primary; Secondary; Regional

The R403 road is a regional road in Ireland, linking the N4 at Lucan in County Dublin to Carbury in County Kildare.

It starts, heading west, at a roundabout on the Leixlip Road (R148) and crosses the M4 motorway past Weston Airport and into County Kildare.

It follows the Dublin Road to Celbridge where it crosses the River Liffey with the R405, then heads southwest along the Clane Road to Clane.

A 10 km (6.2 mi) stretch of ruler-straight road takes it west via Prosperous to Allenwood. Its final stretch westwards is through the Bog of Allen via Derrinturn to Carbury, where it terminates at the R402

The route is 43 km (27 mi) long.

== See also ==
- Roads in Ireland
- National primary road
- National secondary road
