= Cadac =

Cadac may refer to:

== Companies ==
- Cadac Group, a software and information technology company
- Cadac Electronics, a manufacturer of sound mixing desks
- Cadac (South Africa), a manufacturer of gas and outdoor equipment

== People with the name ==
- Cadac-Andreas, an Irish scholar
