= Connell (barony) =

Connell Connail (Irish)
- Barony
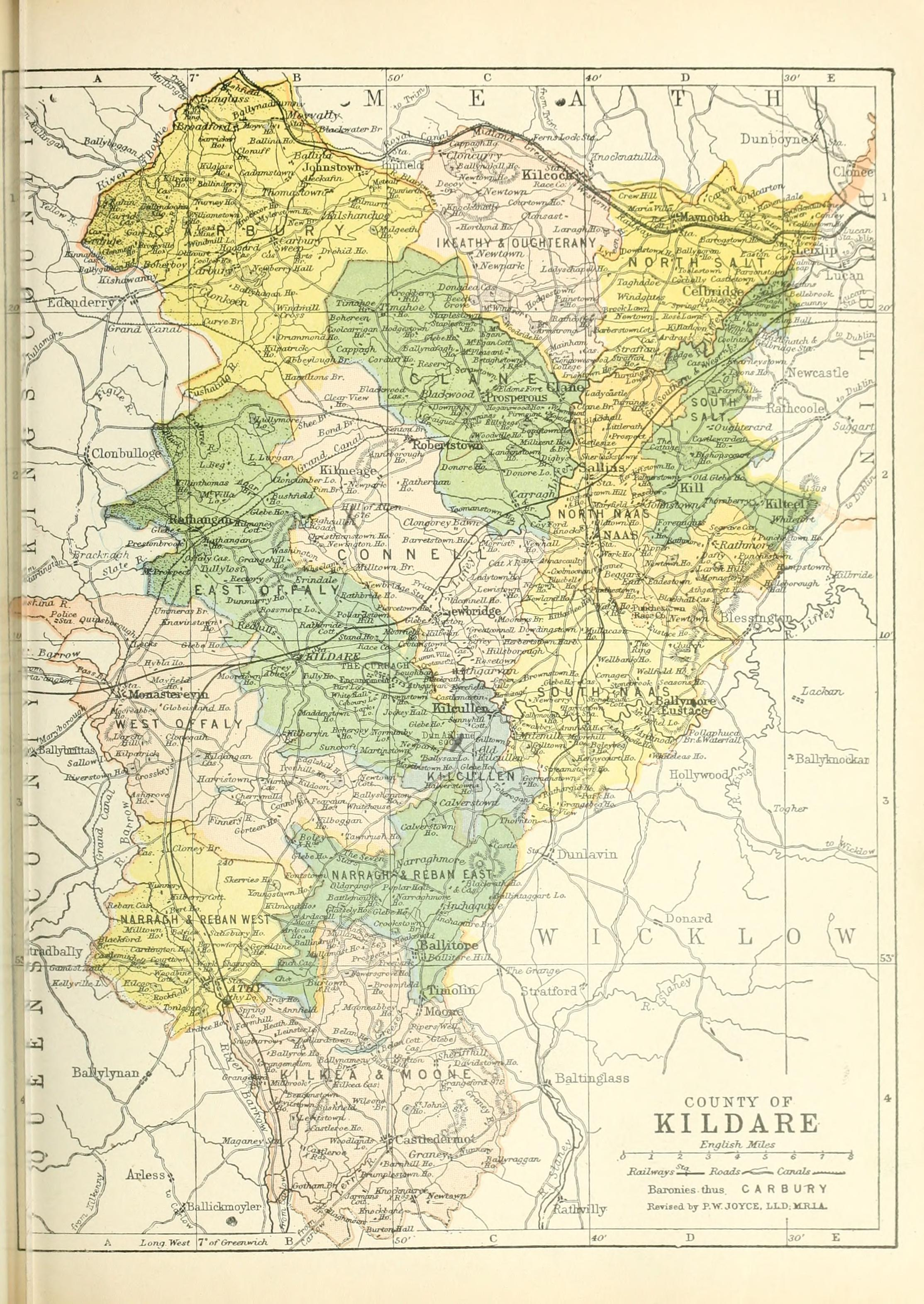
- Map of the baronies of Kildare. Connell is coloured pink, in the centre.
- Sovereign state: Ireland
- County: Kildare

Area
  - Total: 140.77 km^{2} (54.35 sq mi)

Connell (Irish: Connail), also called Great Connell, is a barony in County Kildare, Ireland.

== Etymology ==
Connell derives its name from Old Connell (Irish Seancongbhail/Seanchonail, "old settlement"), a site in modern Newbridge where Saint Conleth lived as a hermit until his consecration in AD 490. Later it was the site of Connell Ford, a crossing point on the Liffey, and Great Connell Priory was built on the east bank in 1202.

== Location ==
Connell barony is found in central County Kildare, from the bend of the Liffey to the Hill of Allen.

== History ==
Connell barony was part of the ancient territory of the Uí Fáeláin sept of the Uí Dúnlainge branch of the Laigin sept, and ancestral home of the Uí Broin before the arrival of the Normans. The Uí Thuathail (O'Tooles), allies of the O'Byrnes, were also here.

== List of settlements ==
Below is a list of settlements in Connell barony:

- Allenwood
- Athgarvan
- Kilmeage
- Newbridge
- Robertstown
