= Cogitosus =

7th-century Irish hagiographer

Cogitosus (fl. c. 650) was an Irish monk, who wrote the Vita Sanctae Brigidae.

== Life ==
Cogitosus was a monk of Kildare, an important monastery in Ireland, who wrote the oldest extant vita of Saint Brigid, Vita Sanctae Brigidae, around 650. There is a controversy as to whether he was related to Saint Brigid. Muirchú moccu Machtheni names Cogitosus as the first Irish hagiographer.

Cogitosus writes in fairly good Latin, much better indeed than might be expected in that age, likely drawing from earlier documents which had preserved older traditions of Brigid's life. His description of the church of Kildare with its interior decorations is specially interesting for the history of early Irish art and architecture. He describes in some detail the tombs of Brigid and Conleth. There are at least two contemporary English translations of Cogitosus's Life of St Brigid: one by Connolly and Picard in 1987 and another in 1993 by Liam da Paor.

== See also ==
- Caolánn
- Cadac-Andreas
- Manchán of Min Droichit
- Irish Augustine
