= Conleth =

5th-century Irish bishop and saint

Saint Conleth
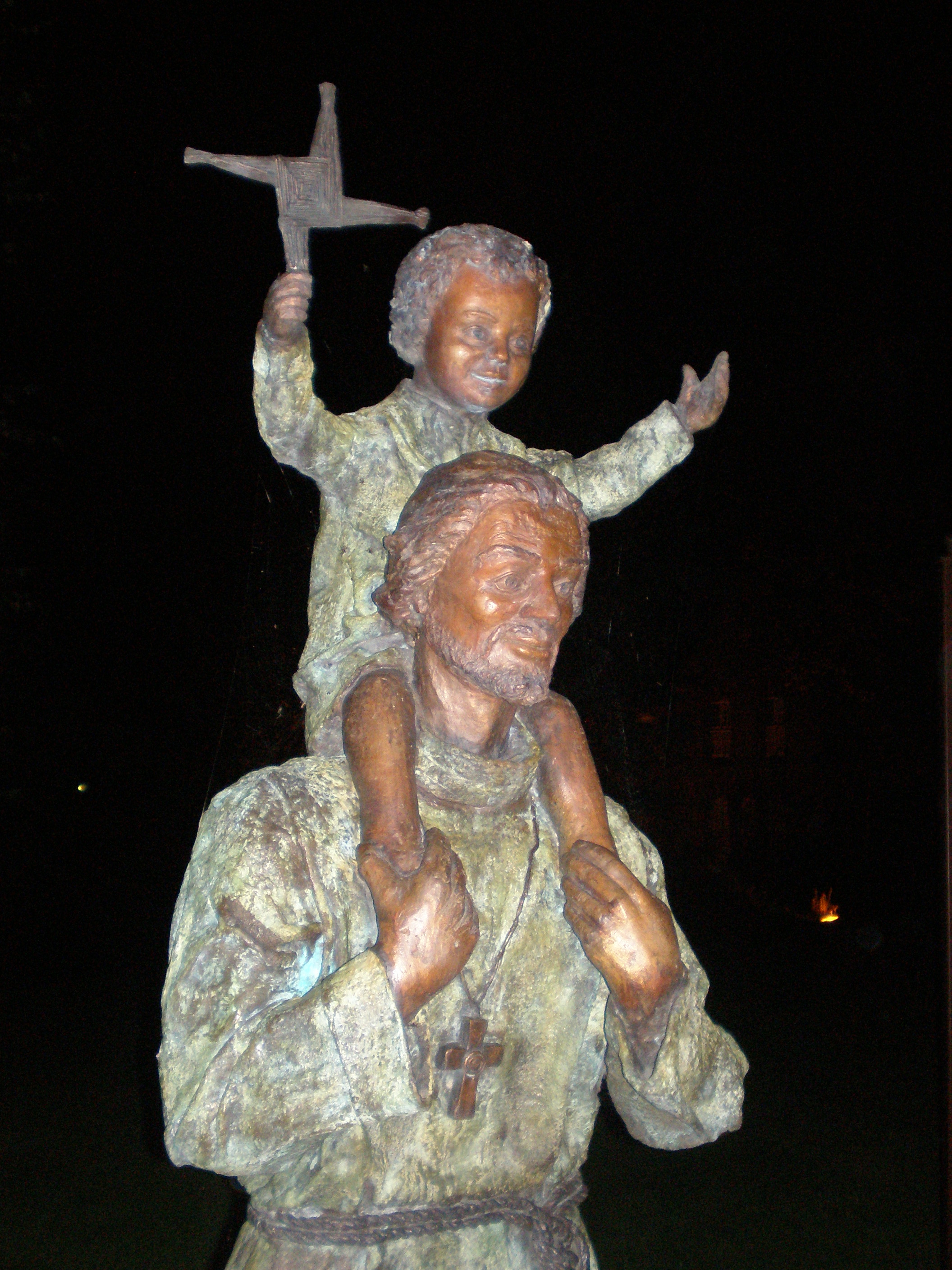

First Bishop of Kildare
- Born: c. 450
- Died: 4 May 519
- Venerated in: Catholicism, Anglicanism, Eastern Orthodox Church
- Feast: 4 May, Additionally, 4th Sunday of Pascha in the Orthodox Church
- Patronage: Diocese of Kildare and Leighlin

Saint Conleth (/ˈkɒnləθ/) (Note: Old Irish: Conláed [ˈkon̪l̪aːi̯ð]; Modern Irish: Naomh Conlaodh; also Conlaeth; Conlaid; Conlaith; Conlath; Conlian, Hugh the Wise)) was an Irish hermit and metalworker, also said to have been a copyist and skilled illuminator of manuscripts. He is believed to have come from the Wicklow area.

== Life ==
While living in seclusion at Old Connell on the River Liffey in what is now Newbridge Conleth was persuaded by Saint Brigid to make sacred vessels for her convent. Conleth, Tassach of Elphin (Saint Patrick's craftsman), and Daigh (craftsman of Ciarán of Saigir) were acclaimed the "three chief artisans of Ireland" during their period. Conleth was head of the Kildare school of metal-work and penmanship. According to Brigid's biographer, Cogitosus, a community of monks grew up which, under his guidance, excelled in the making of beautiful chalices and other metal objects needed in the church, and in the writing and ornamentation of missals, gospels, and psalters. A product of Saint Conleth's metalwork for which he is noted is the crozier that he fashioned for Saint Finbarr of Termonbarry.

The Diocese of Kildare appears to have been founded around 490, by Conleth who, with the assistance of St. Bridget, then presiding over the monastery, erected the cathedral and became first bishop. Cogitosus, in his Life of Brigid, says he was invited by Brigit to become bishop of her double monastery at Kildare.

Conleth died when he was attacked by wolves in the forests of Leinster on pilgrimage to Rome on 4 May 519 and was buried nearby. A vellum fragment inscribed with his name has been dated to c.700 AD. In 799 his relics were transported and laid beside Brigid's in the great cathedral in Kildare. His relics were finally laid to rest in Connell in 835 to protect the inhabitants from invading Danes.

== Veneration ==
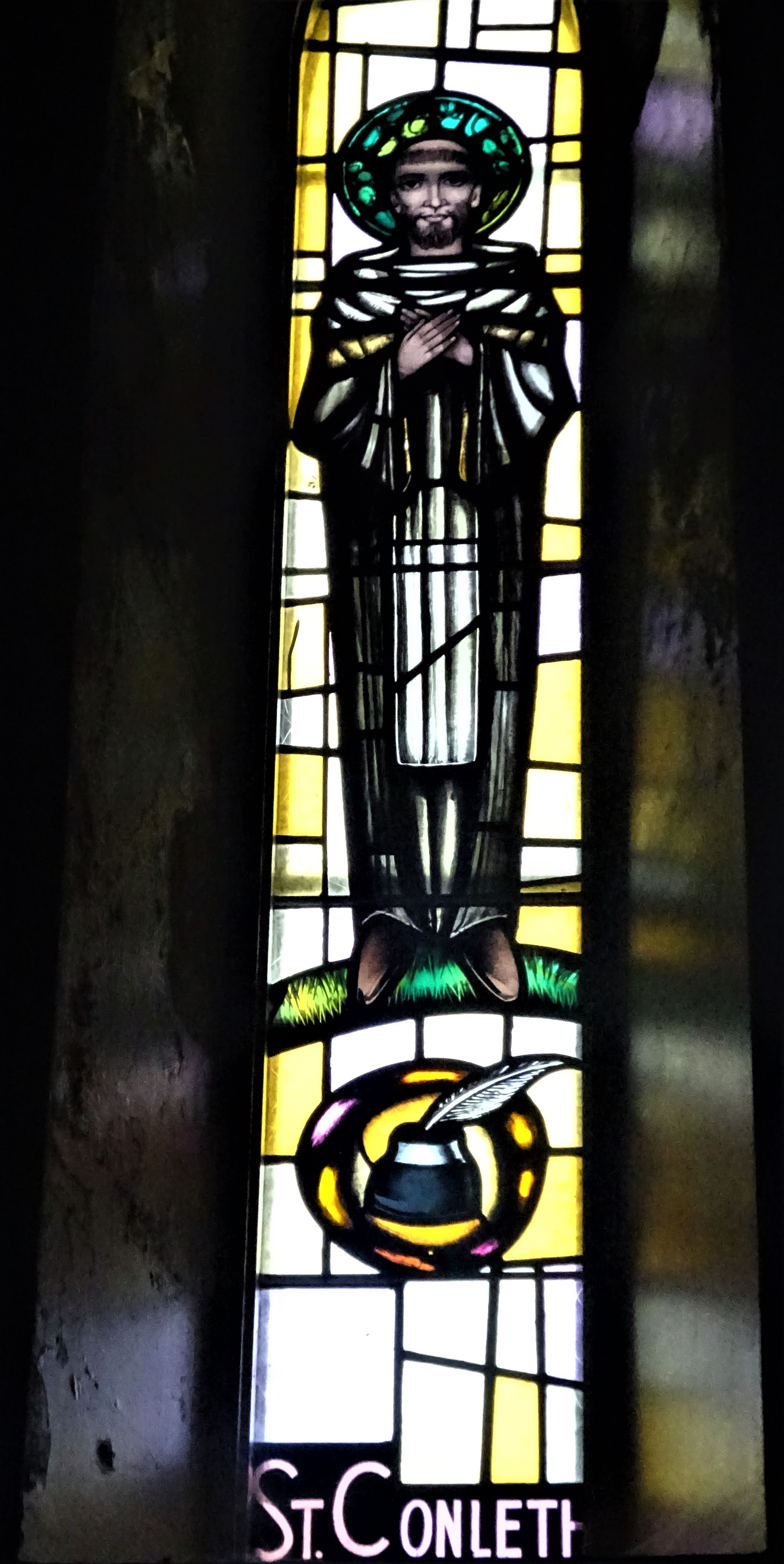
St Conleth in stained glass, Doolin

Conleth is the patron saint of the Roman Catholic St Conleth's Parish, which includes Newbridge and the surrounding areas. Old Connell – the site of Conleth's original cell, which is now a graveyard – is within the parish limits.

Conleth's feast day is 4 May. Every year on the Sunday after St Conleth's Day a pilgrimage takes place from the parish church in Newbridge to Old Connell, about two miles outside the town.

== Legacy ==
St. Conleth's College is located in Ballsbridge, Dublin

His tale and community are briefly described in Sabine Baring-Gould's "A Book of Cornwall" (now in the public domain,) in which his name is spelled "Conlaeth."

St. Conleth's Park is the name of Kildare GAA's home stadium, located in Newbridge, County Kildare.
