= Pollardstown Fen =

Nature reserve in County Kildare, Ireland

- Eanach Bhaile Pholaird
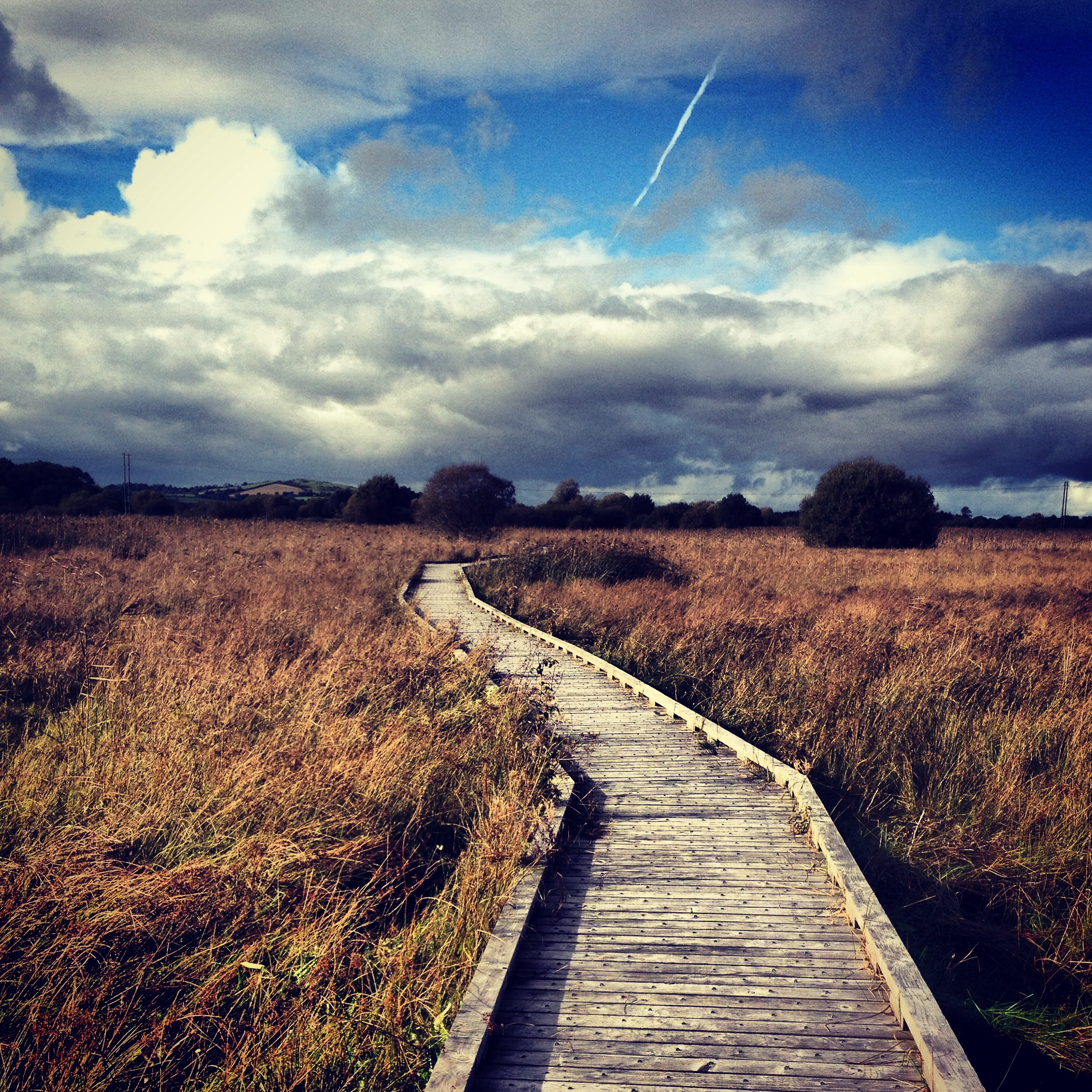

- Location within Ireland
- Location: County Kildare, Ireland
- Nearest city: Newbridge
- Coordinates: 53°11′01″N 6°50′45″W
- Area: 321 acres (130 ha)
- Governing body: National Parks and Wildlife Service

Designations

Ramsar Wetland
- Designated: 30 May 1990
- Reference no.: 474

Pollardstown Fen (Irish: Eanach Bhaile Pholaird) is Ireland's largest extant calcareous spring-fed fen, a national nature reserve, Special Area of Conservation, and Ramsar site of approximately 321 acres (1.3 km^{2}) in County Kildare.

== Features ==
Pollardstown Fen was legally protected as a national nature reserve by the Irish government in 1986. It is also a Special Area of Conservation and is deemed to be of international importance as a habitat. 60% of the fen is owned by the Irish state, and its designation as a reserve was in response to drainage schemes from the 1960s which converted parts of the fen into agricultural land. In 1990, the site was also declared Ramsar site number 474.

Pollardstown Fen is the largest spring-fed calcareous alkaline fen still extant in Ireland, fed from the Curragh aquifer with petrifying springs. Among the notable species found on the site are Cladium mariscus, Caricion davallianae, Vertigo geyeri, Vertigo angustior, and Vertigo moulinsiana. The site's flora is dominated by black bog rush and saw sedge, with other species recorded including the fly orchid, western bladderwort, sphagnum moss and broad-leaved bog cotton. A large number of birds are found on the reserve such as sand martins, skylarks, mute swans, herons, little grebe, coots, moorhens, reed buntings, water rails, snipe, sedge warblers, pintail and tufted ducks. Other animals that inhabit the area include otters, hares, pygmy shrews, and smooth newts. There is a boardwalk at the site for visitors.

The fen was impacted for a time by the side-effects from the construction of the Kildare by-pass in 2003, when the water levels in the fen were disrupted.

== Gallery ==
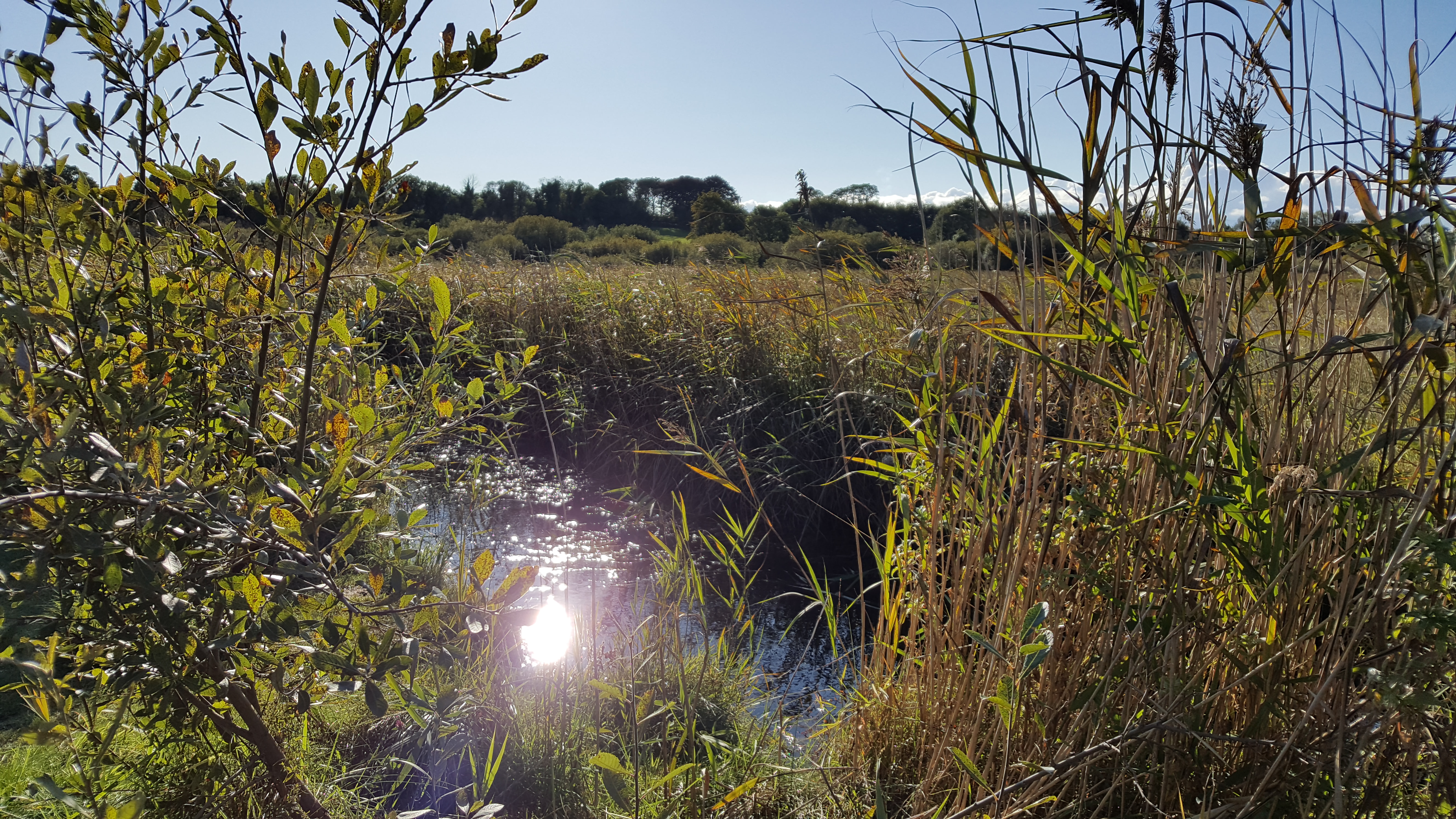

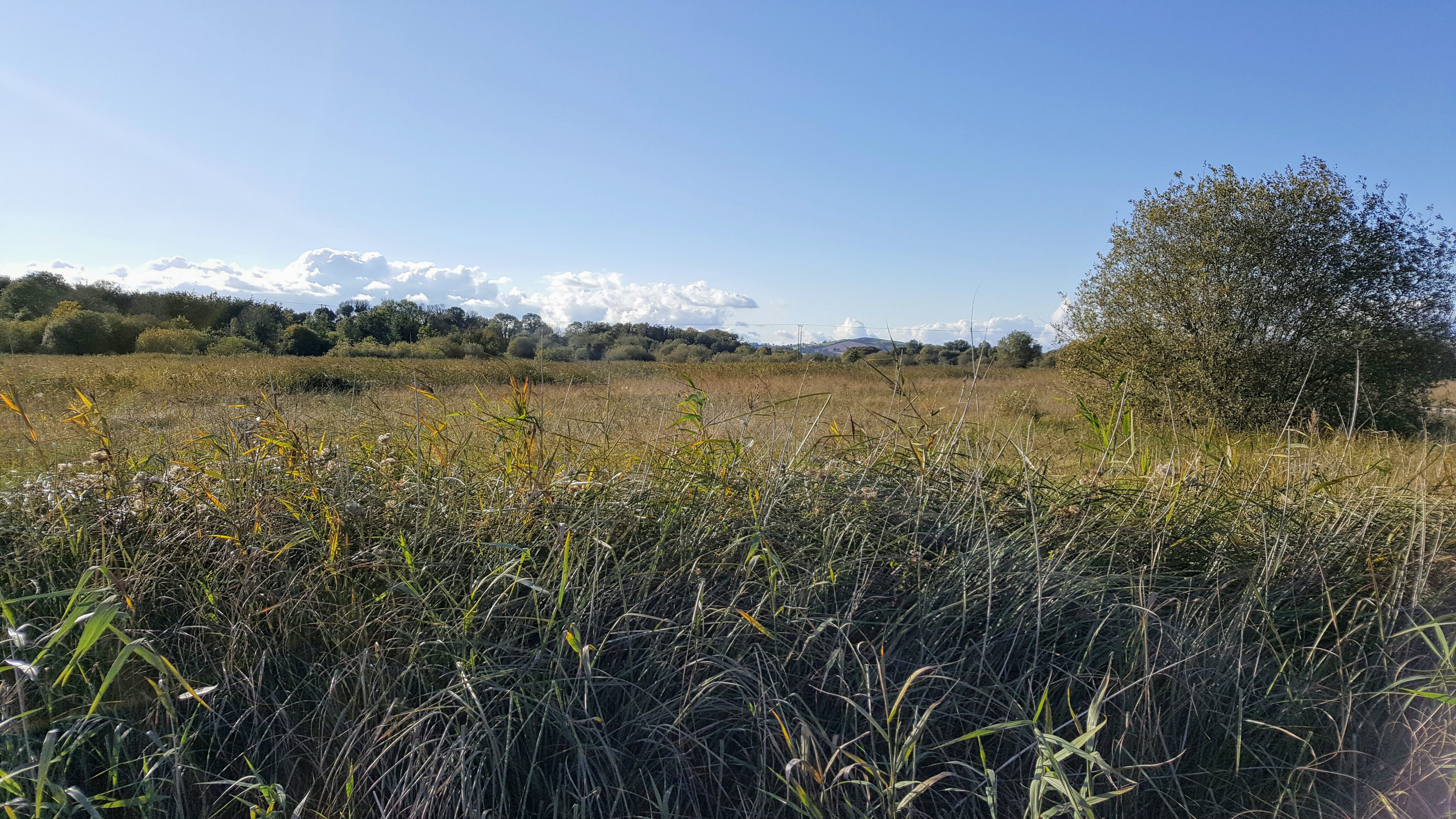

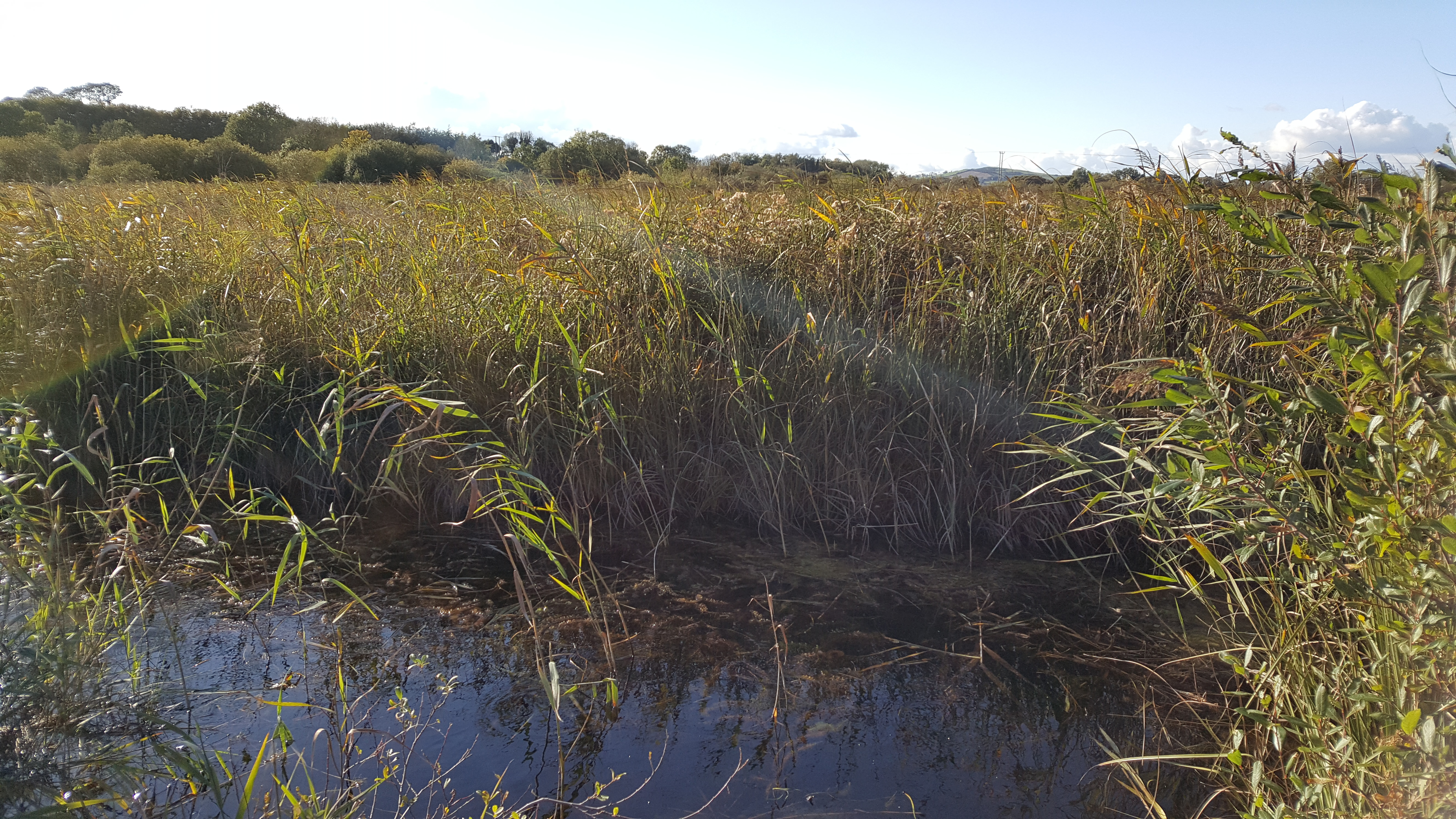

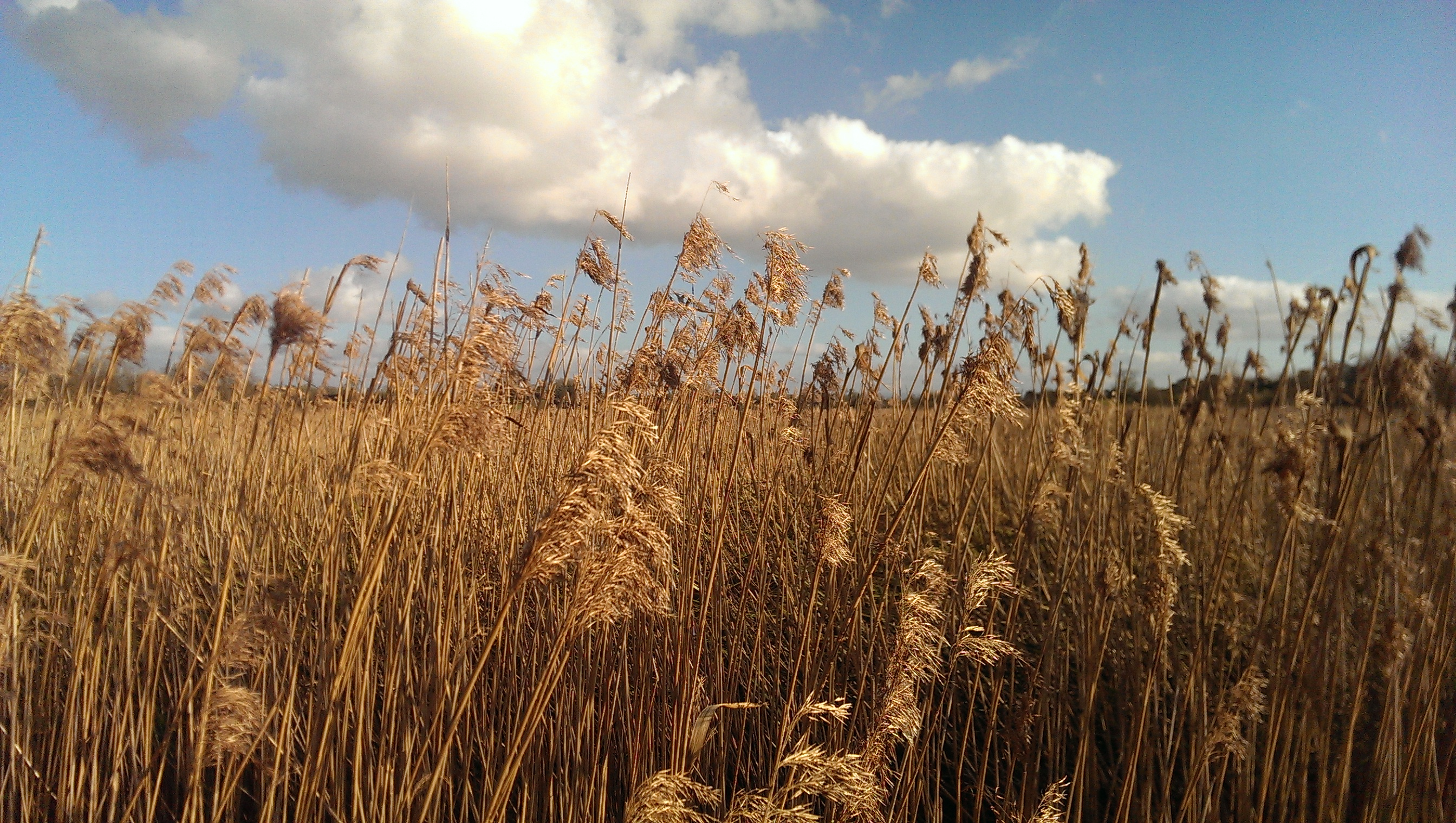

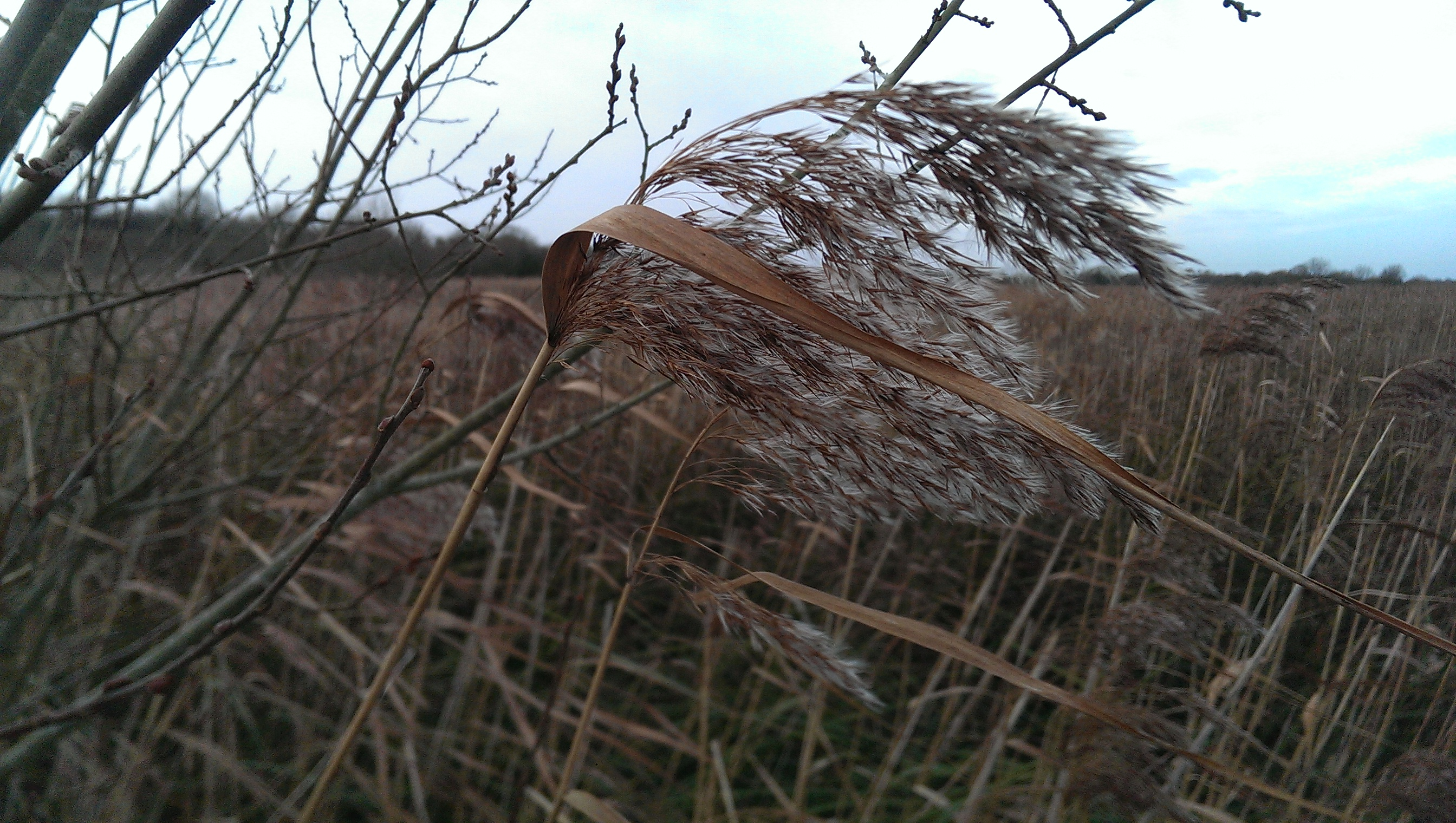

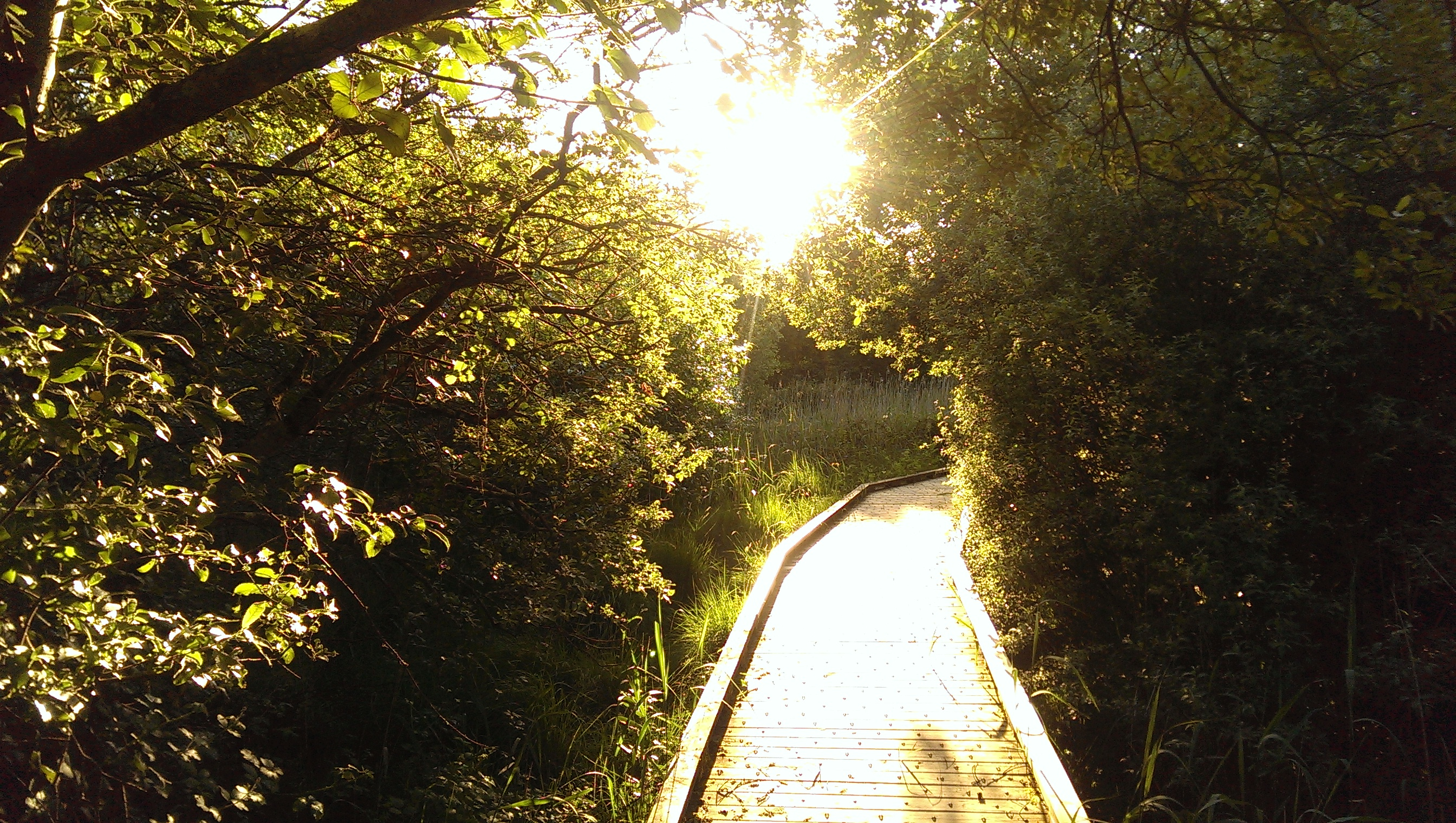
