= Newbridge Barracks =

- Newbridge, County Kildare
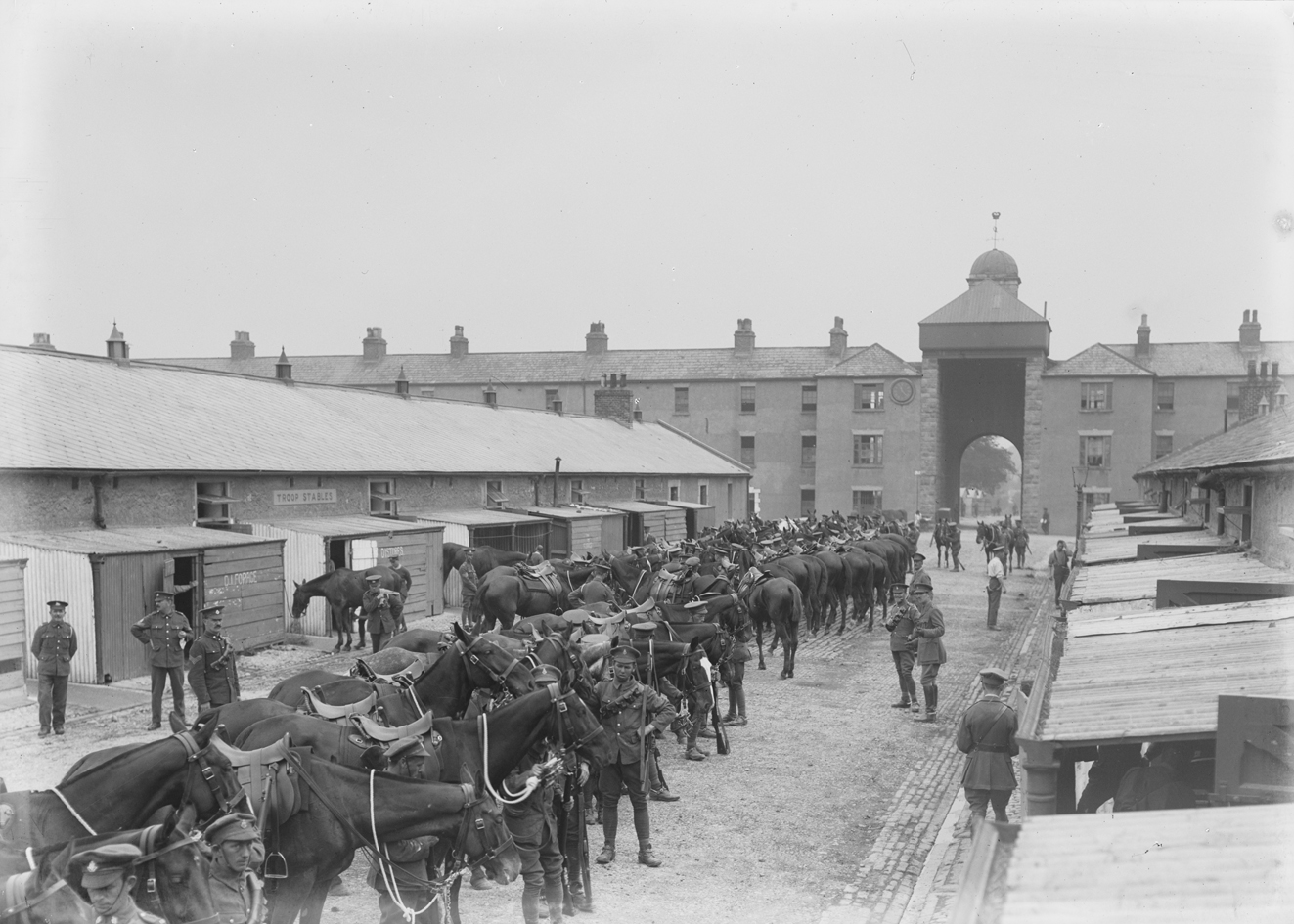
- Stables at the barracks

Site information
- Type: Barracks
- Operator: (Republic of Ireland) Irish Army

Location
- Location within Ireland
- Coordinates: 53.1803°N 6.7958°W

Site history
- Built: 1815–1819
- Built for: War Office
- In use: 1819–1920s

Garrison information
- Garrison: Cavalry regiments

Newbridge Barracks, also known as the Cavalry Barracks, was a military installation in Newbridge, County Kildare in Ireland. Built in the early 19th century, the barracks closed in the 1920s.

== History ==
The barracks were commissioned for the use of the cavalry regiments on land acquired from three local landlords: Eyre Powell of Great Connell, Ponsonby Moore of Moorefield and William Hannon of Kilbelin. This barracks originally extended from the River Liffey to Cutlery Road, and from Newbridge's Main Street to Military Road; however little of the barracks remains except the old walls and gateways which can be found on the Athgarvan Road, and to a lesser degree on Cutlery Road.

The "Watering Gates", located at the entrance to the Town Park, was also constructed as part of the original barrack building (and as the name suggests, this "gate" was used to facilitate access to the river for the horses from the barracks). At the same time, Eyre Powell gave land north of the new high road for building houses and shops to serve the new barracks.

During the Irish Civil War, the barracks were evacuated and then used as an internment camp to accommodate republican prisoners and a mass breakout took place there between 14 and 15 October 1922. After briefly being occupied by the forces of the Irish Free State, the barracks were redeveloped and a large part of the site was transferred to the Gaelic Athletic Association as St Conleth's Park. A chapel-cum-school, which had formed part of the barracks, became Newbridge Town Hall.

== See also ==
- List of Irish military installations
