= Lily O'Brien's =

Irish chocolatier

- Company type: Private
- Industry: Confectionary
- Headquarters: Newbridge, County Kildare, Ireland
- Key people: Mary Ann O'Brien
- Website: lilyobriens.ie

Lily O'Brien's is an Irish chocolatier based in Newbridge, County Kildare. The founder and chairman is Mary Ann O'Brien, who founded the company in 1992 from her kitchen. The company is named after her then two-year-old daughter Lily. It is based in the IDA Business Park on Green Road.
