= Caolánn =

Irish monk and author

Caolánn, Irish monk and author, fl. 7th century.

== Biography ==
Caolánn is credited with writing a Life of Brigid of Kildare in Latin verse. He seems to have built the first chapel on Croughnakeela, an island two miles west of Macdara's Island, off the coast of Connemara.

He was also a monk of Inisketair Abbey, on Lough Derg on the river Shannon. The outline of what seems to be a church, leacht and enclosure walls, along with other unidentified buildings, can still be seen on the island.

== See also ==
- Cumméne Fota
- Bricín
- To Lua Foto
- Cogitosus
