= Newbridge Town Hall =

Municipal building in Newbridge, County Kildare, Ireland

- Halla an Bhaile Droichead Nua
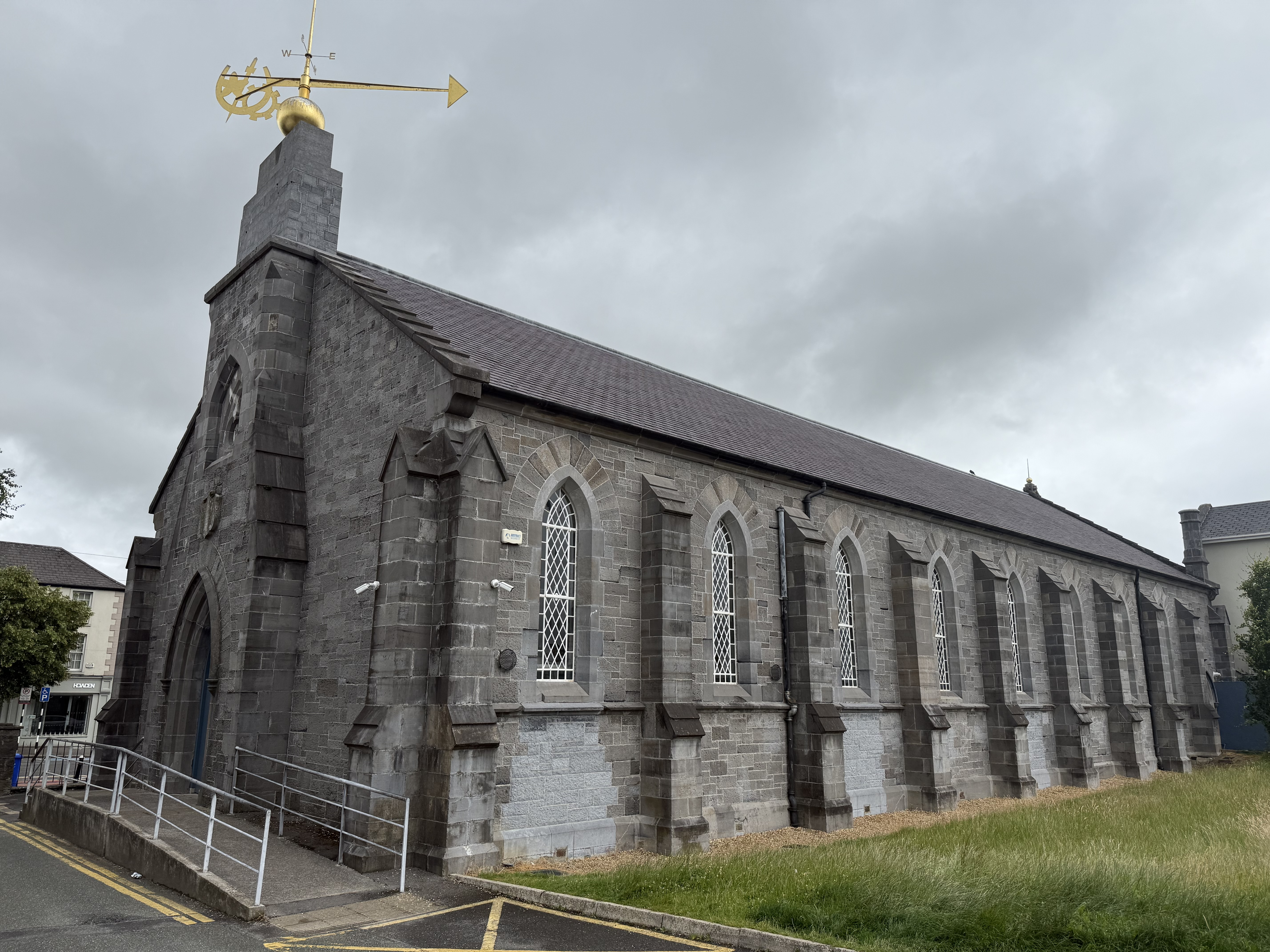
- Newbridge Town Hall

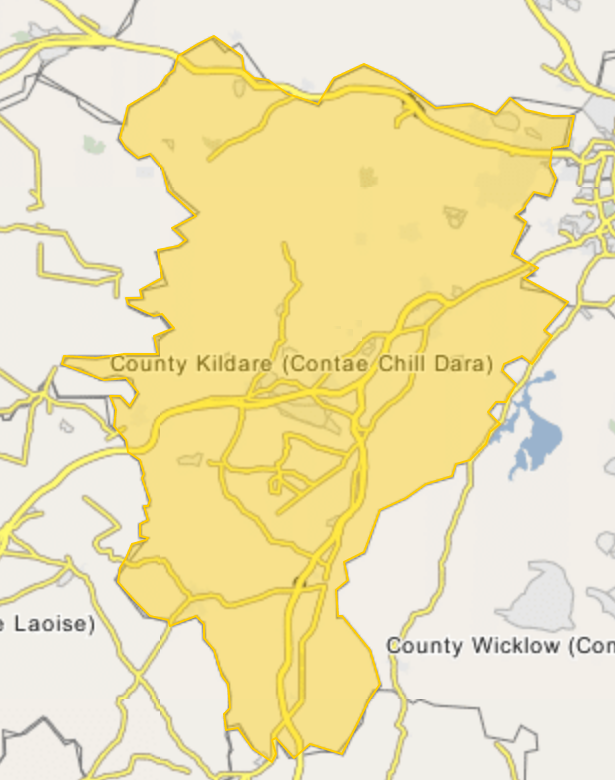
- Location within County Kildare

General information
- Architectural style: Gothic Revival style
- Location: Main Street, Newbridge, Ireland
- Coordinates: 53.1808°N 6.7968°W
- Completed: 1860

Newbridge Town Hall (Irish: Halla an Bhaile Droichead Nua) is a municipal building in Main Street in Newbridge, County Kildare, Ireland. It is currently used as a community events venue.

== History ==
The building was commissioned as a combined chapel and school for Newbridge Barracks in the mid-19th century. The barracks were used by British cavalry regiments and located on and around the area now occupied by St Conleth's Park and the site selected for the new building was on the northwest boundary of the barracks compound.

The building was designed in the Gothic Revival style, built in ashlar stone and was completed in 1860. The design involved an asymmetrical main frontage of nine bays facing onto Main Street. The left-hand bay contained a small arched doorway, while the other eight bays were fenestrated by arched metal lattice windows. The bays were flanked by buttresses. The main access was at the southwest end of the building, where there was an arched doorway with voussoirs, and a trefoil above.

After the British Army had handed over the barracks to republican forces in May 1922, the site was secured by representatives of the Irish Free State and the barracks were used as an internment camp. However, the combined chapel and school was of no further military use and was acquired by the local town commissioners for municipal use in 1927. The conversion works involved the installation of internal partitions to create a series of offices.

Following implementation of the Local Government Act 2001, under which the town commissioners were succeeded by Newbridge Town Council, the town hall became the offices of the new council. The building became vacant after the town council was abolished in 2014. The building was subsequently restored: the works, which involved the replacement of the slate roof, repairs to the metal lattice windows and the remove of internal partitions, was completed in November 2015. The main hall was subsequently made available for community use.
