= William Cator =

Irish cricketer and clergyman

Personal information
- Full name: William Cator
- Born: 26 August 1839; Moorfield, Ireland
- Died: 6 June 1902 (aged 62); Woodbastwick, Norfolk, England
- Batting: Unknown

Domestic team information
- Years: Team
- 1860: Oxford University

Career statistics
| Competition | First-class |
|---|---|
| Matches | 1 |
| Runs scored | 2 |
| Batting average | 1.00 |
| 100s/50s | –/– |
| Top score | 2 |
| Catches/stumpings | –/– |
- Source: Cricinfo, 11 February 2020

William Cator (26 August 1839 – 6 June 1902) was an Irish first-class cricketer and clergyman.

The son of Albermarle Cator, he was born in Ireland in August 1839 at Moorfield. He was educated in England at Bromsgrove School, before going up to St John's College, Oxford. While studying at Oxford, he made a single appearance in first-class cricket for Oxford University against Cambridge University in The University Match of 1860 at Lord's. Batting twice in the match, he was dismissed for 2 runs in the Oxford first-innings by Henry Plowden, while in their second-innings he was dismissed without scoring by Robert Lang. After graduating from Oxford, Cator travelled to Australia and upon his return in 1870, he was ordained in the Church of England. He was the rector of Beckenham from 1873–85. Cator died in June 1902 at Woodbastwick, Norfolk.
