= Newbridge, County Kildare =

Town in County Kildare, Ireland

Newbridge Droichead Nua (Irish)
- Town
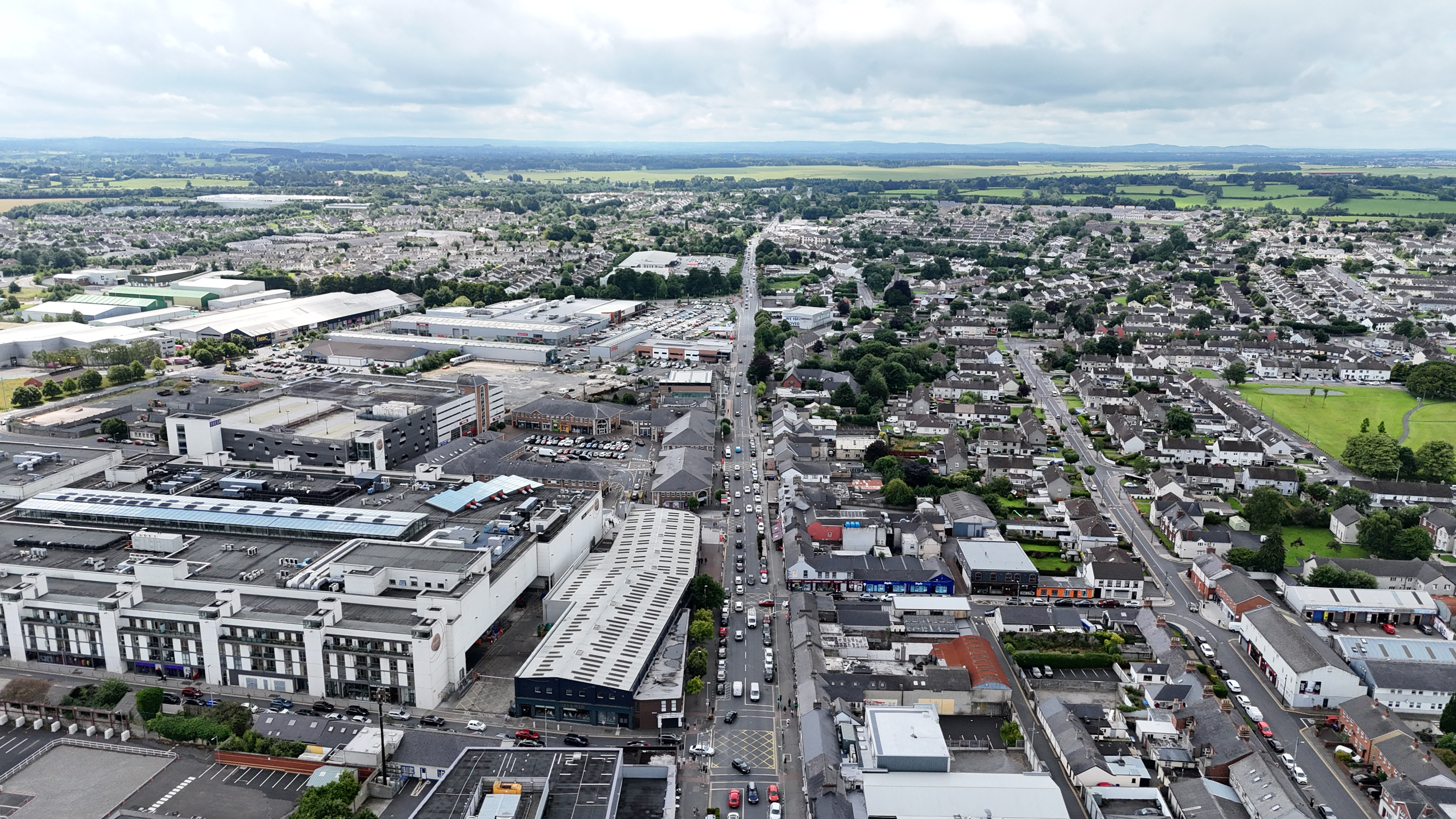
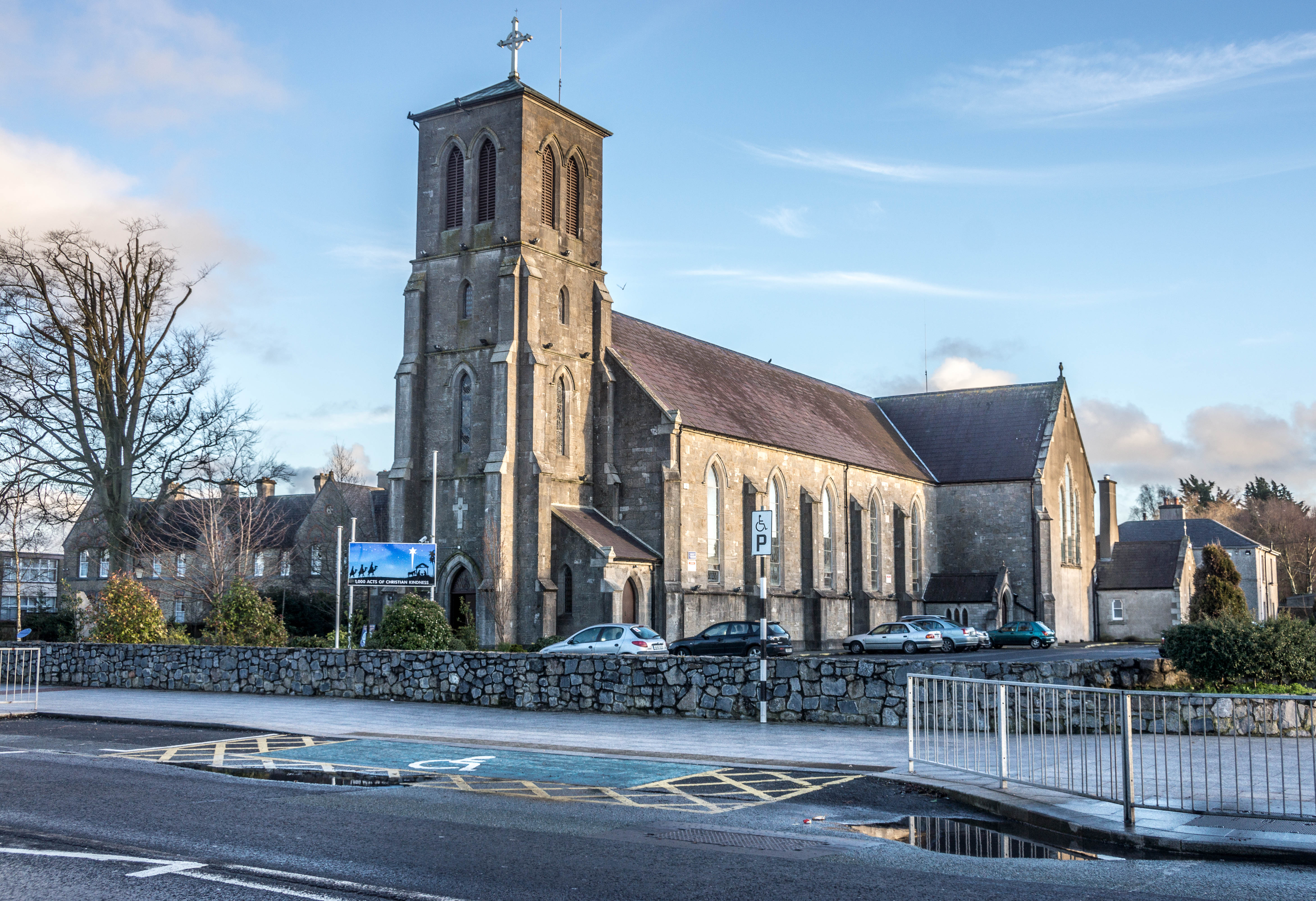
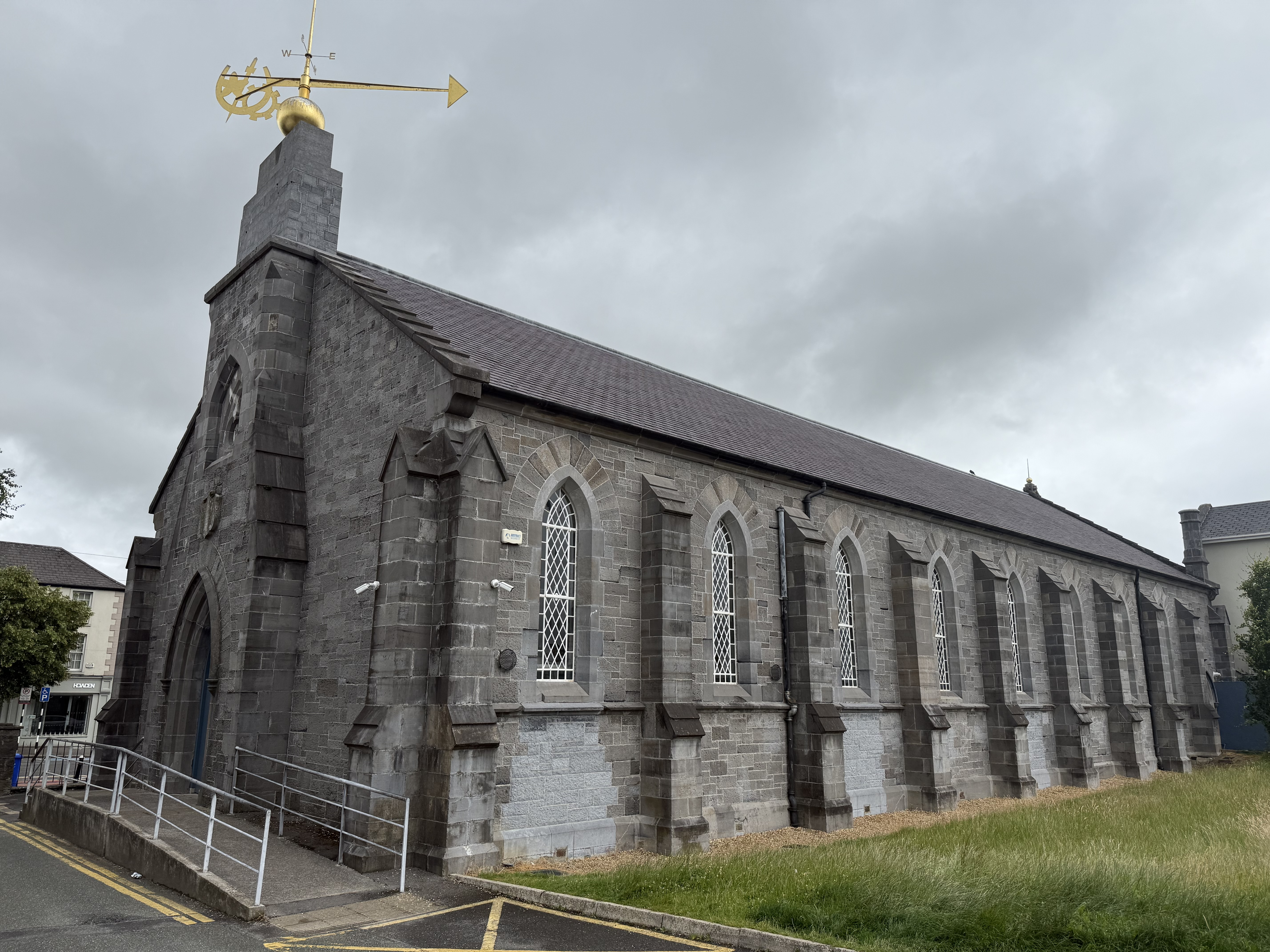
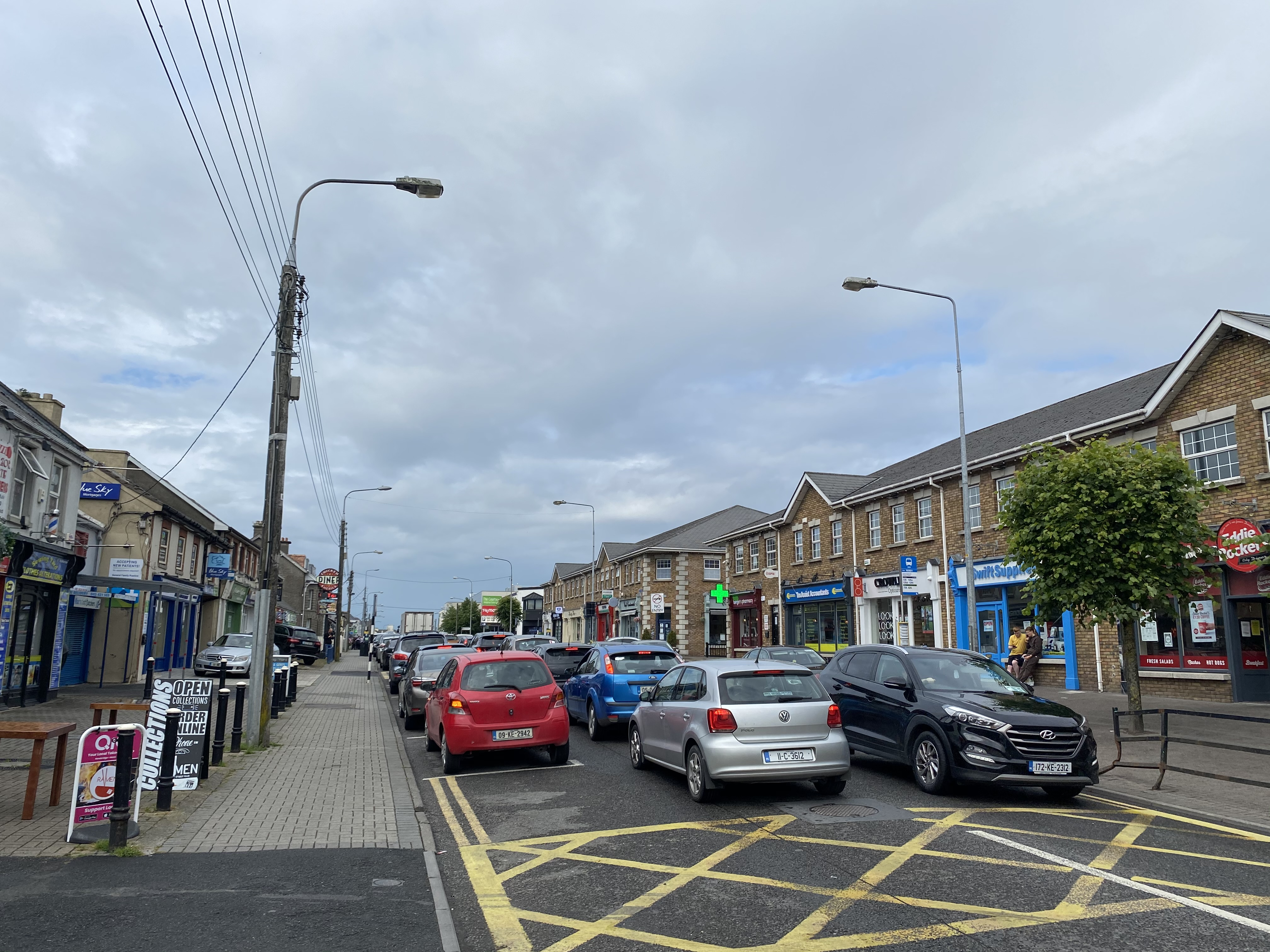
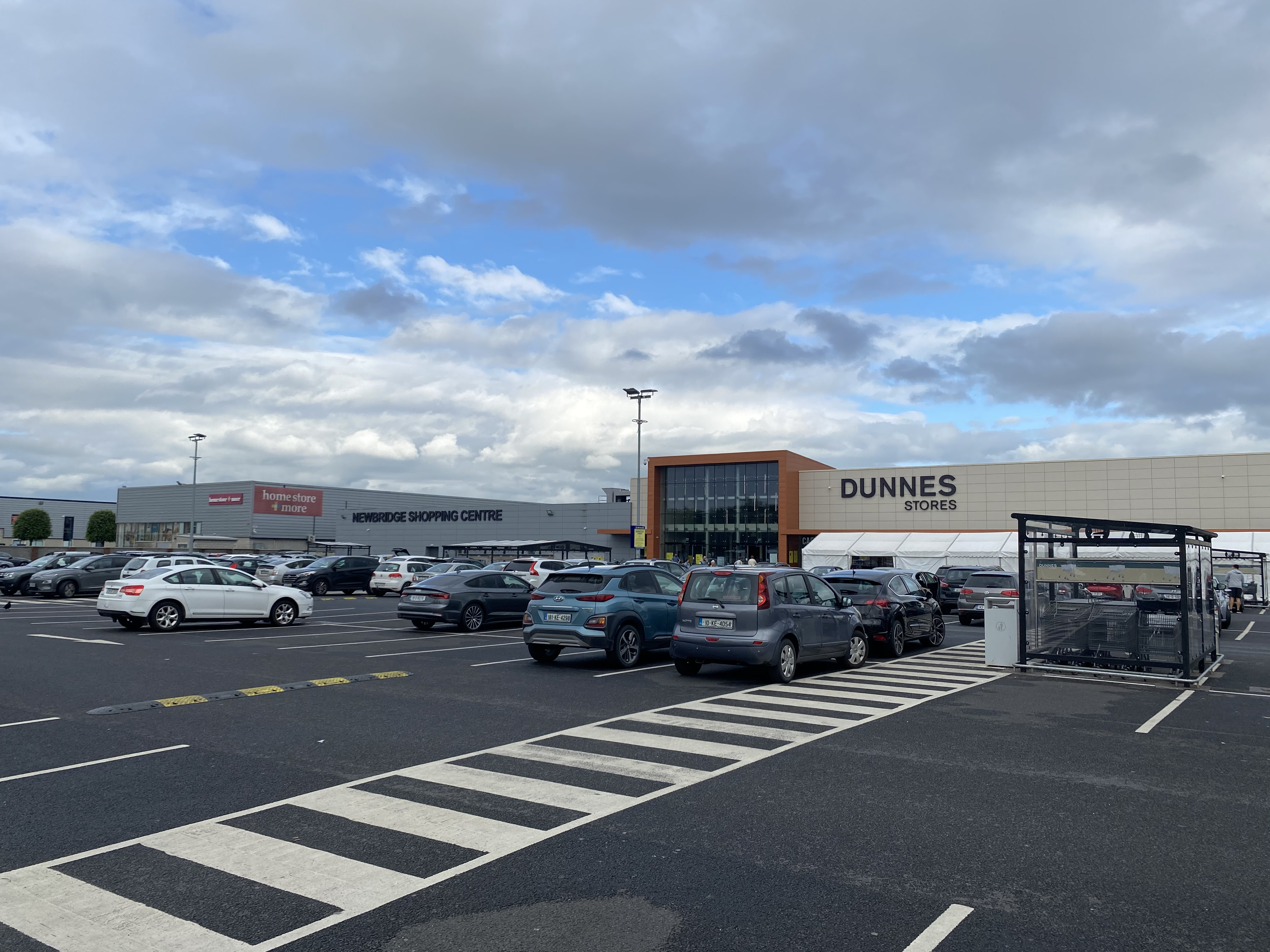
- Skyline of Newbridge St Conleth's Church Newbridge Town Hall Edward Street Newbridge Shopping Centre

- Location in Ireland Newbridge (Europe)
- Coordinates: 53.1805°N 6.7959°W
- Country: Ireland
- Province: Leinster
- County: County Kildare

Area
  - Total: 6.26 km^{2} (2.42 sq mi)
- Elevation: 90 m (300 ft)

Population (2022)
  - Total: 24,366
  - Rank: 16th
  - Density: 3,632/km^{2} (9,410/sq mi)
- Time zone: UTC±0 (WET)
  - Summer (DST): UTC+1 (IST)
- Eircode: W12
- Telephone area code: 045
- Irish Grid Reference: N801152
- Website: newbridge.ie

Newbridge, officially known by its Irish name Droichead Nua (pronounced [ˈd̪ˠɾˠɛçəd̪ˠ ˈn̪ˠuə]), is a town in County Kildare, Ireland. While the nearby Great Connell Priory was founded in the 13th century, the town itself formed from the 18th century onwards, and grew rapidly alongside a military barracks which opened in the early 19th century. Taking on the name Newbridge (An Droichead Nua) in the 20th century, the town expanded to support the local catchment, and also as a commuter town for Dublin. Doubling in population during the 20 years between 1991 and 2011, its population of 24,366 in 2022 makes it the second largest town in Kildare and the sixteenth-largest in Ireland.

== Name ==
The Irish language name of the town is the official name, "An Droichead Nua", meaning simply "The New Bridge" and was introduced in the 1930s. Noble and Keenan's map of Kildare 1752, drawn before the town was started, marks 'The New Bridge' in the vicinity of 'Old Connel'. A number of other places marked on this map, including Ballymany and Morristown Biller, are represented in the names of modern housing estates and streets.

== History ==
=== Early settlement ===
Settlement in the area dates from the 13th century (with the foundation of Great Connell Abbey), and the current town is made up of six ancient civil parishes along with portions of others. The parishes are Ballymany, Great Connell, Killashee, Morristown Biller, Old Connell, and Carnalway. Great Connell Priory was an important Priory, founded in 1202 by the Augustinian Canons.

=== Beginning of the modern town ===
Historical population
Year	Pop.	±%
1831	577	—
1841	792	+37.3%
1851	934	+17.9%
1861	2,875	+207.8%
1871	3,286	+14.3%
1881	3,372	+2.6%
1891	3,207	−4.9%
1901	2,903	−9.5%
1911	3,400	+17.1%
1926	2,249	−33.9%
1936	2,375	+5.6%
1946	3,151	+32.7%
1951	3,007	−4.6%
1956	4,157	+38.2%
1961	4,419	+6.3%
1966	5,161	+16.8%
1971	6,444	+24.9%
1979	5,758	−10.6%
1981	10,716	+86.1%
1986	11,503	+7.3%
1991	12,971	+12.8%
1996	13,363	+3.0%
2002	19,542	+46.2%
2006	18,520	−5.2%
2011	21,561	+16.4%
2016	22,742	+5.5%
2022	24,366	+7.1%

The earliest known mention of Newbridge was by traveller and bookseller John Dunton in 1698, though he does not refer to any settlement other than at Ballymany. A mass house (Roman Catholic Chapel) was built beside the bridge about 1730 and an inn, called New Bridge Inn, was in existence in 1750. The first bridge was destroyed by floods in 1789, and William Chapman, an engineer on the Grand Canal extension to Naas, was employed to rebuild it the following year. He moved the site from the 'Watering Gates' to its present location and redirected the high road from Buckley's Cross (roundabout at Pfizer) to the new bridge, and continuing as what is today Main Street and Edward Street to the turnpike at Gandogue Lane (behind the modern Credit Union building). The old high road continued in use to serve the village and mass house, which was taken down in 1852 upon the opening of the new church (St Conleth's).

The origin of the modern town lies in the establishment of the Newbridge Cavalry Barracks. Main Street took shape at the same time as the barracks were being built. From 1819, various cavalry regiments were stationed at Newbridge and brought much business to the town.

Newbridge expanded rapidly after the Curragh Camp was established in 1855. Eyre Street (named after the local landlord Eyre Powell) and Edward Street (named after Prince Edward, later King Edward VII, who was stationed on the Curragh at the time) were built between 1855 and 1870. The new railway opened in 1846, and churches were built at Rosberry Common (1819 – St. Eustace's, Dominican), at Moorefield (1828 – St Patrick's, Church of Ireland) and at Chapel Lane (1852 – St Conleth's, Roman Catholic) to cater for the increasing population. A National School was opened on the Railway Road in 1842 (now the Parish Office) and a boarding school at the Dominican Friary in 1852. The town continued to prosper until the withdrawal of the cavalry in May 1922 on the establishment of the Free State. It went into a period of decline thereafter, but since the 1960s has seen considerable growth and has become a shopping catchment and commuter town.

Newbridge Town Hall was commissioned as a chapel-cum-school for the local barracks, completed in 1860 and converted for municipal use in 1927.

== Location ==
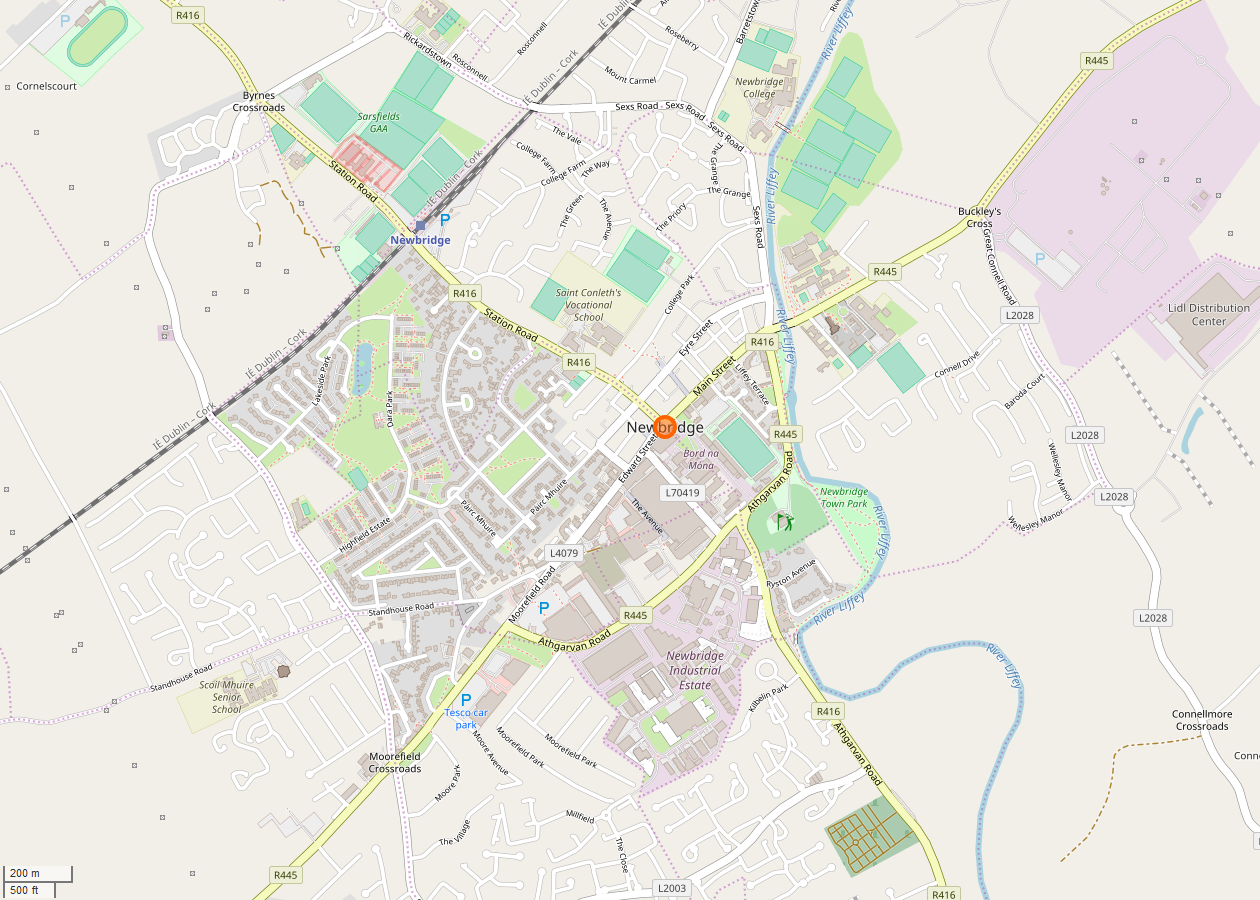
Map of Newbridge

The town is located on the banks of the River Liffey. Upriver are towns such as Athgarvan, Kilcullen and Blessington, while downriver are the towns of Caragh, Clane and Celbridge.

Newbridge is bounded by the Curragh Plains to the west, Pollardstown Fen and the Bog of Allen and Moulds Bog to the northwest. Around the Curragh and to the east are a number of stud farms. To the south, the motorway now forms a boundary to the town.

== Economy ==
=== Industry ===
The area's industrial history includes rope making (at Irish Ropes PLC, established 1933, now closed) and carpet manufacturing (Curragh Tintawn Carpets Limited, established 1937, closed 2012). Cutlery and silverware is crafted at the Newbridge Silverware plant. Pharmaceutical companies such as Oral-B and Pfizer have also based themselves in the town, and the latter is located at Little Connell.

Lily O'Brien's, the Irish chocolatier, is based in the IDA Business Park on Green Road, Bord na Móna has its headquarters in the centre of Newbridge, and the Department of Defence has a base on Station Road.

The Kildare/Leixlip Branch of the general workers union SIPTU has its headquarters at Georges Street.

Many people living in Newbridge commute to work in Dublin.

=== Retail ===
Retailers such as Marks & Spencer and Zara are anchor tenants of the town's shopping centre. The Whitewater Shopping Centre also has a 6-screen cinema, operated now by Odeon Cinemas, which opened in December 2009. There are also Penneys and TK Maxx outlets in Newbridge.

== Transport ==
=== Rail ===
The town is situated on the main Dublin–Cork railway line which connects the town to Dublin, Cork, Limerick, Galway, Waterford and Westport. A regular commuter train service operates between Newbridge and Dublin. Newbridge railway station opened on 4 August 1846 and was closed for goods traffic on 6 September 1976.

=== Road ===
The M7 motorway bypasses the town; the R445 connects the town to the bypass (Junctions 10 and 12 on the M7) along the route previously forming part of the N7. The M9 to Kilcullen, Carlow, Kilkenny and Waterford leaves the M7 west of Naas at Junction 11.

== Religion ==
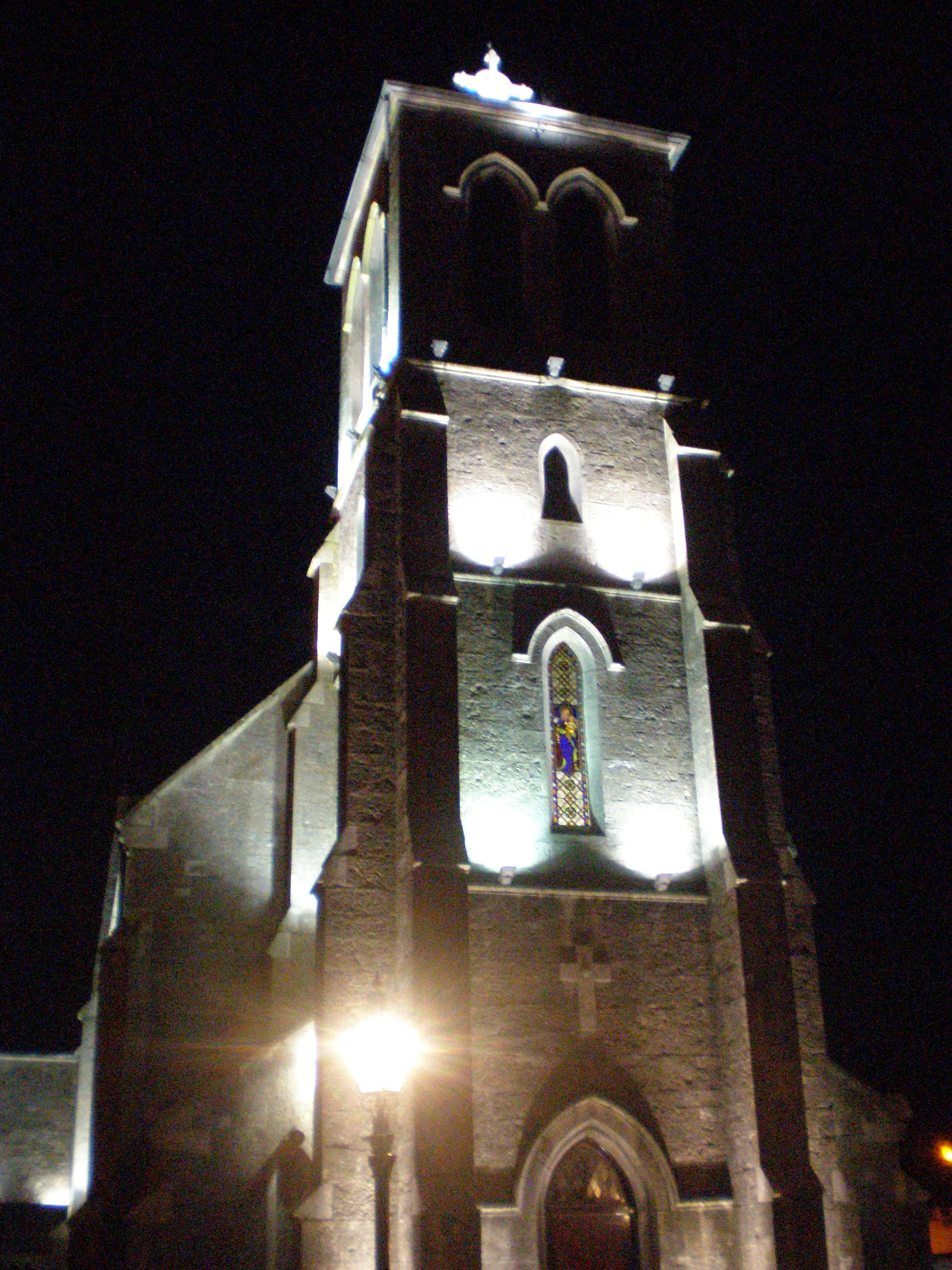
St Conleth's Parish Church in Newbridge

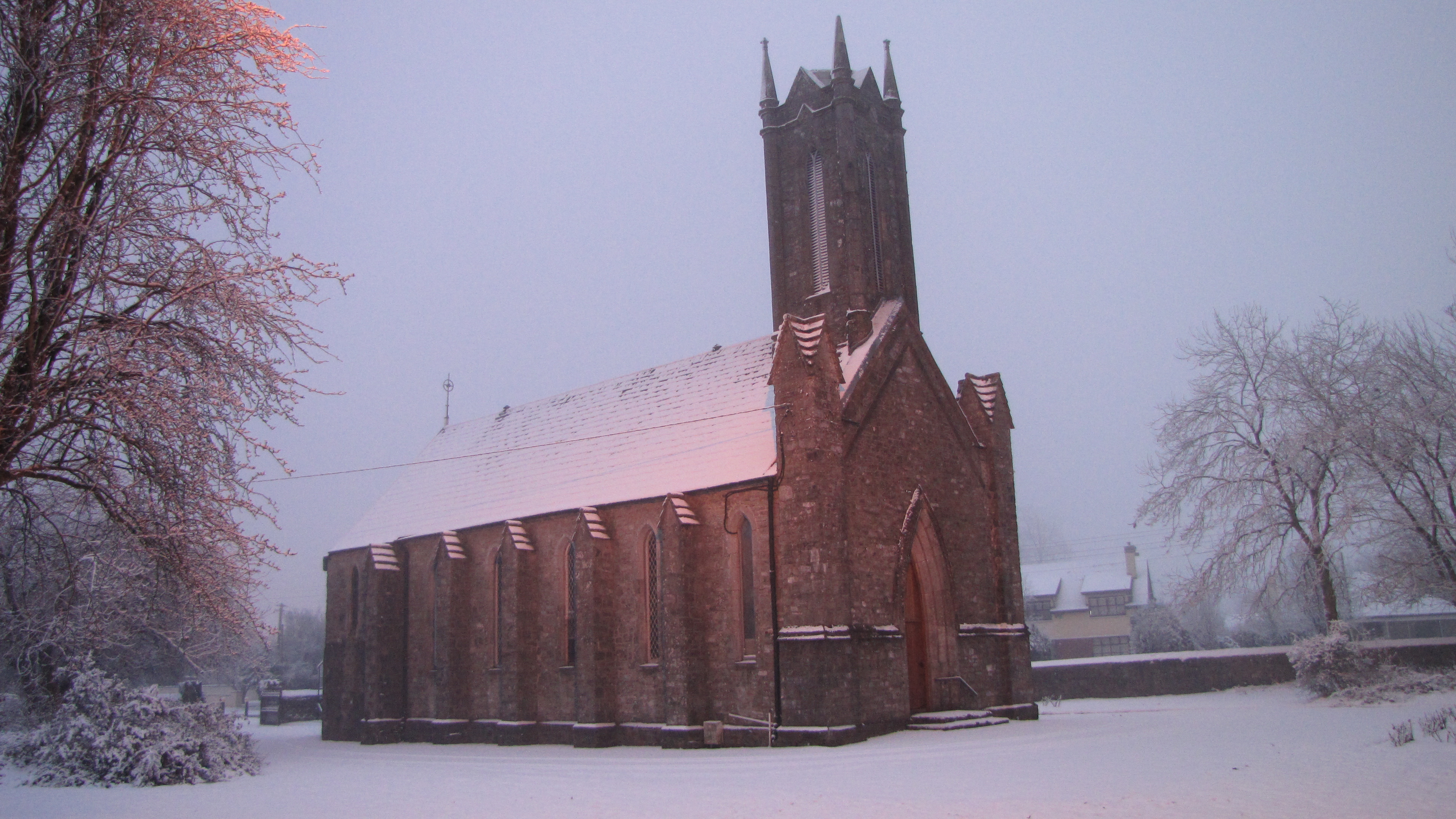
Church of Ireland, Moorefield

There are a number of churches in Newbridge representing several denominations. In the Roman Catholic divisions, Newbridge is situated in St. Conleth's Parish in the Diocese of Kildare and Leighlin, and the parish has a total of three churches in the town: St Conleth's Parish Church (1852), Cill Mhuire (1983) and the Dominican St. Eustace's Church (1966). A Church of Ireland church (1828) is located in the Moorefield area of town, and is part of St. Patrick's Anglican Parish.

Newbridge Sports Centre hosts the African faith group "The Kingdom of Heavenly Water, Fire and Mountains" and a Jehovah's Witness Kingdom Hall is located just outside the town, near Milltown. Open Arms Church is located within Newbridge Industrial Estate. Newbridge Bible Fellowship Church is located in the Roseberry section of the town.

== Education ==
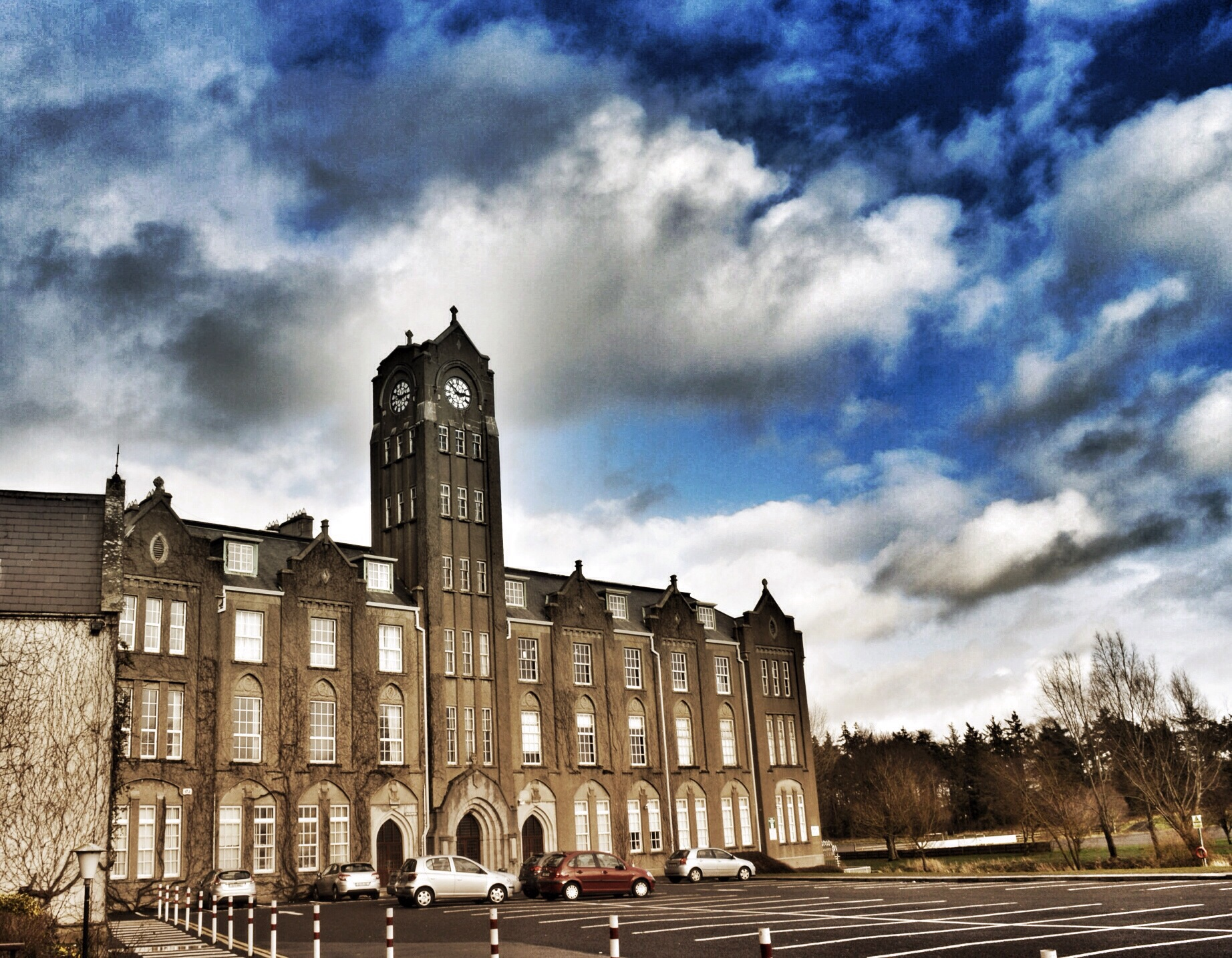
Newbridge College

=== Primary ===
Primary schools serving the town include Scoil Mhuire, Gaelscoil Chill Dara (an Irish-medium school), The Patrician Primary School, St Conleth's Infant Primary School, Scoil Mhuire, St Conleth's & St Mary's Primary School, St Patrick's National School, Newbridge Educate Together National School, and Scoil Bride in Athgarvan.

=== Secondary ===
Secondary schools in the area are the Patrician Secondary School, the Holy Family Secondary School, St. Conleth's Community College, St. Mark's School, Newbridge College, a fee-paying co-educational secondary school, run by the Dominican Order, and Leinster Senior College, a small private fee-paying school. Gaelcholáiste Chill Dara, located near the town, is County Kildare's only Irish-speaking second-level school. Sundai Ireland International School, a Japanese international school, was previously based in Newbridge.

=== Further education ===
The Kildare VTOS adult education centre is located in the town and offers programmes to mature students.

== Sport and recreation ==
=== Clubs and societies ===
Newbridge is home to Kildare Gaelic Athletic Association's county grounds, and the sport's two local club teams, Sarsfield's GAA and Moorefield GAA.

Active association football clubs include Newbridge Town F.C and Newbridge Colts Football Club, both members of the Kildare and District Football League. Kildare County F.C. previously fielded teams in the League of Ireland First Division.

Newbridge RFC is the town's only rugby club. Founded in 1996, with the amalgamation of the Curragh RFC and Kilcullen RFC, Newbridge RFC compete in the J1 Division 1 Leinster League.

The Kildare History & Family Research Centre is based at the library in Newbridge and houses a local history collection and genealogical research service.

Newbridge Tidy Towns Association's main aim is to improve the living environment in the town via participation in the national Tidy Towns competition. Since the launching of National Tidy Towns Competitions in 1958, Newbridge has received: the silver medal in 2013 and 2014, Bronze Medals 2008 to 2012 inclusive, and a Race against Waste 2005 Certificate of Excellence / Highly Commended award.

Ryston Sports and Social Club is located on Athgarvan Road and was originally set up for the staff of the Irish Ropes Factory. It is overseen by a voluntary committee and has sections undertaking pitch and putt, badminton, bowls and other activities.

=== Amenities ===
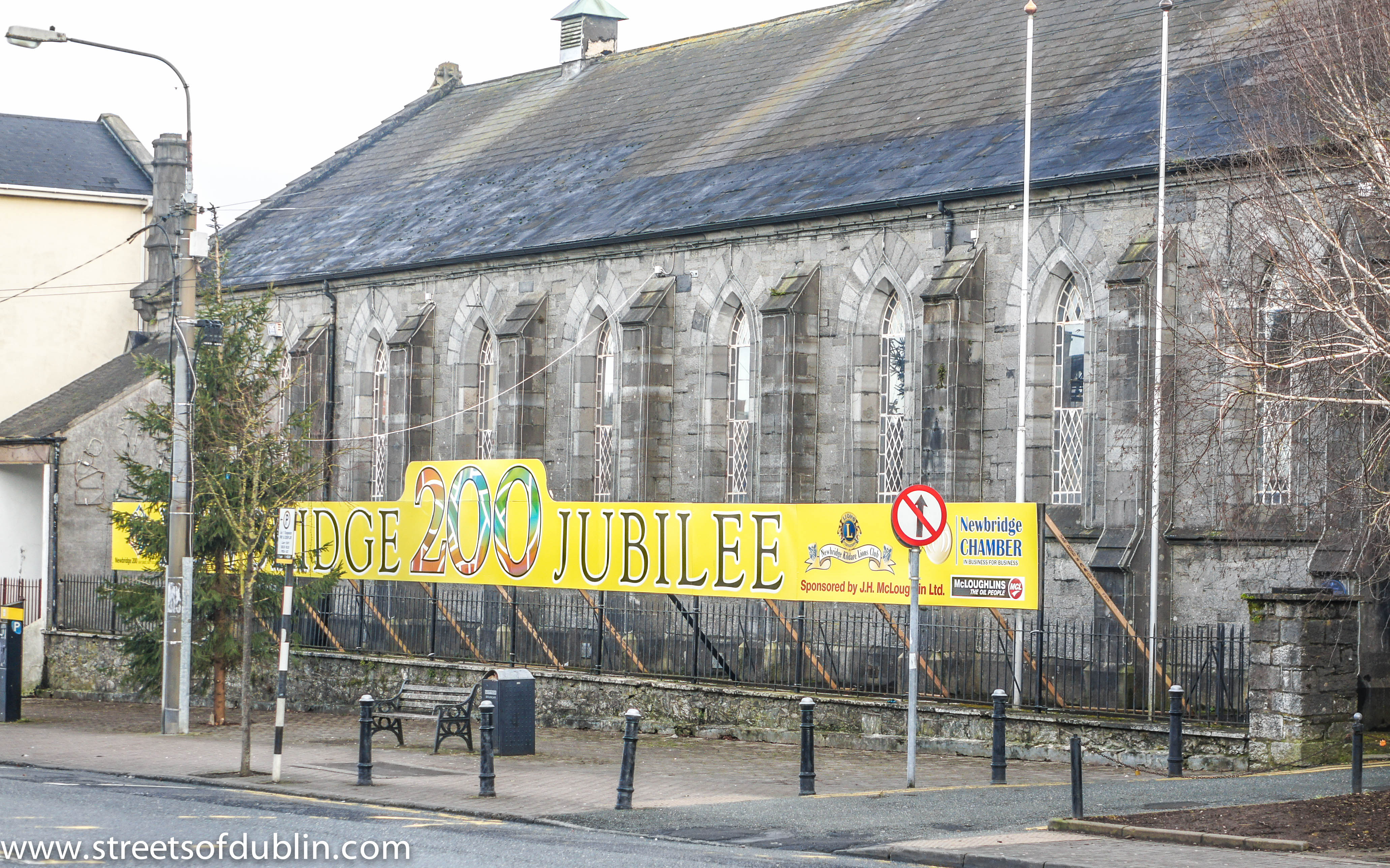
Newbridge Town Hall

Newbridge has a public library and an arts centre, the Riverbank Arts Centre.

The Liffey Linear Park is an outdoor amenity alongside the River Liffey. This park, comprising seven acres, stretches from the bridge to Athgarvan Road (Gables Leisure Centre). There is also a sports centre (with both indoor and outdoor facilities), three gyms, two swimming pools, a children's playground, and a number of sports and leisure clubs.

There are several golf courses in the area, with water sports, fishing and the Curragh Racecourse also nearby. Newbridge Greyhound Stadium, northwest of the town, is Kildare's only greyhound racing track. Nearby (and within walking distance of the town) are the Curragh Plains, Moulds Bog (Roseberry), and Pollardstown Fen.

The Gables Guest House & Leisure Centre is located on Kilcullen Road and has a 20m swimming pool and gym.

== International relations ==
Newbridge is twinned with Bad Lippspringe (Germany), Ocala (Florida, United States, since 2008) and Argentré-du-Plessis (France, since 2017).

== People ==
- Luka Bloom (born 1955 as Barry Moore), musician
- William Cator (1839–1902), cricketer and clergyman
- Clare Daly (born 1968), politician
- Pat Eddery (1952–2015), jockey
- JyellowL (born 1998), rapper
- Kathleen Lonsdale (1903–1971), scientist
- Dónal Lunny (born 1947), musician
- Jack McKenna (born 1942), darts player
- Christy Moore (born 1945), singer and musician
- Sinéad O'Carroll (born 1973), singer
- Cian O'Neill, Gaelic footballer and manager
- Bridget Partridge (1890 – 1966), nun
- Jarlath Regan (born 1980), comedian
- Karen Shinkins (born 1976), sprinter

== See also ==
- List of towns and villages in Ireland
