= Cadac (South Africa) =

South African outdoor leisure company

CADAC (Commercial And Domestic Appliance Company), a South African company headquartered in Randburg, a suburb of Johannesburg, is a marketer of a wide range of outdoor leisure and patio products designed for durability, portability and convenience.

CADAC was acquired by the Dometic Group in September 2021.

== Products ==
The main focus of their product range is charcoal and LPG-powered barbecues and grills. Cadac appears among the key suppliers in the global charcoal barbecues equipment market. The company also sells a range of camping gear such as tents, cooler boxes and various outdoor clothing items.

== History ==
CADAC, a division of MTM Trading, was founded in 1951 and started the manufacture of portable liquefied petroleum gas (LPG) cylinders, lamps, cookers, stoves, heaters and barbecue equipment in 1957.

== Website ==
https://www.cadacinternational.com/en_us/
