= Cadac-Andreas =

Irish scholar

Cadac-Andreas, Irish scholar, fl. 798 – 814.

Cadac-Andreas was an Irish scholar at the court of Charlemagne who roused the ire of Bishop Theodulphus for lengthy and pedantic approach to exegesis, which he apparently delighted in. A nameless court poet, possibly connected to Theodulphus, wrote further of him, scorning and parodying

- his fascination with etymologies in the three sacred languages
- pondering who was the first person to perform something in the Bible
- pedantic, long-winded, interest in terminology

Theodulphus grew to detest Cadac-Andreas so much that he strongly urged Charlemagne to have him dismissed from court. Yet much to the frustration of Theodulphus, and no doubt others at court, Cadac was subsequently awarded a bishopric by the king.

Theodulphus, on the other hand, was later sent into exile by Louis the Pious.

== Sources ==
- "Hiberno-Latin Literature to 1169", Dáibhí Ó Crónín, "A New History of Ireland", volume one, 2005.
- Theodulf und der Ire Cadac-Andreas, Bernhard Bischoff, Mittelalterliche Studien, three volumes, Stuttgart, 1966–81.
